This is a partial list of unnumbered minor planets for principal provisional designations assigned during 16–31 October 2003. Since this period yielded a high number of provisional discoveries, it is further split into several standalone pages. , a total of 471 bodies remain unnumbered for this period. Objects for this year are listed on the following pages: A–E · F–G · H–L · M–R · Si · Sii · Siii · Siv · T · Ui · Uii · Uiii · Uiv · V · Wi · Wii and X–Y. Also see previous and next year.

U 

|- id="2003 UG380" bgcolor=#d6d6d6
| 0 ||  || MBA-O || 16.9 || 2.3 km || multiple || 2003–2021 || 05 Jan 2021 || 50 || align=left | Disc.: SDSSAlt.: 2008 ON5 || 
|- id="2003 UJ380" bgcolor=#E9E9E9
| – ||  || MBA-M || 19.1 || data-sort-value="0.64" | 640 m || single || 5 days || 24 Oct 2003 || 6 || align=left | Disc.: SDSS || 
|- id="2003 UK380" bgcolor=#fefefe
| 0 ||  || MBA-I || 18.4 || data-sort-value="0.62" | 620 m || multiple || 2003–2020 || 23 Mar 2020 || 51 || align=left | Disc.: SDSS || 
|- id="2003 UP380" bgcolor=#E9E9E9
| 0 ||  || MBA-M || 17.95 || 1.4 km || multiple || 2003–2021 || 03 Oct 2021 || 65 || align=left | Disc.: SDSS || 
|- id="2003 UR380" bgcolor=#d6d6d6
| 2 ||  || HIL || 16.8 || 2.4 km || multiple || 2003–2019 || 28 Nov 2019 || 38 || align=left | Disc.: SDSS || 
|- id="2003 US380" bgcolor=#d6d6d6
| 0 ||  || MBA-O || 17.0 || 2.2 km || multiple || 2003–2021 || 17 Jan 2021 || 90 || align=left | Disc.: SDSSAlt.: 2016 CW53 || 
|- id="2003 UF381" bgcolor=#d6d6d6
| 0 ||  || MBA-O || 17.1 || 2.1 km || multiple || 2003–2019 || 26 Sep 2019 || 47 || align=left | Disc.: SDSSAlt.: 2016 EK45 || 
|- id="2003 UM381" bgcolor=#fefefe
| 0 ||  || MBA-I || 18.3 || data-sort-value="0.65" | 650 m || multiple || 2003–2021 || 03 Oct 2021 || 89 || align=left | Disc.: SDSSAlt.: 2006 KM156, 2010 GU162, 2014 UT38 || 
|- id="2003 UT381" bgcolor=#E9E9E9
| 1 ||  || MBA-M || 18.2 || data-sort-value="0.96" | 960 m || multiple || 2003–2020 || 10 Dec 2020 || 51 || align=left | Disc.: SDSS || 
|- id="2003 UU381" bgcolor=#d6d6d6
| 0 ||  || MBA-O || 17.50 || 1.8 km || multiple || 2003–2021 || 18 Apr 2021 || 61 || align=left | Disc.: SDSS || 
|- id="2003 UX381" bgcolor=#fefefe
| – ||  || MBA-I || 20.5 || data-sort-value="0.24" | 240 m || single || 24 days || 24 Oct 2003 || 11 || align=left | Disc.: SDSS || 
|- id="2003 UA382" bgcolor=#d6d6d6
| 0 ||  || MBA-O || 16.4 || 2.9 km || multiple || 2003–2020 || 19 Jan 2020 || 82 || align=left | Disc.: SDSSAlt.: 2011 SP126 || 
|- id="2003 UE382" bgcolor=#fefefe
| 0 ||  || MBA-I || 19.23 || data-sort-value="0.42" | 420 m || multiple || 1996–2021 || 08 Nov 2021 || 41 || align=left | Disc.: SDSS || 
|- id="2003 UQ382" bgcolor=#fefefe
| 0 ||  || MBA-I || 18.2 || data-sort-value="0.68" | 680 m || multiple || 2000–2021 || 18 Jan 2021 || 79 || align=left | Disc.: SDSS || 
|- id="2003 US382" bgcolor=#E9E9E9
| 0 ||  || MBA-M || 16.7 || 2.5 km || multiple || 2001–2021 || 11 Oct 2021 || 215 || align=left | Disc.: SDSSAlt.: 2010 JS144 || 
|- id="2003 UX382" bgcolor=#E9E9E9
| 0 ||  || MBA-M || 18.47 || data-sort-value="0.60" | 600 m || multiple || 2003–2021 || 17 Jan 2021 || 58 || align=left | Disc.: SDSSAdded on 11 May 2021Alt.: 2009 DK103, 2020 YC8 || 
|- id="2003 UY382" bgcolor=#d6d6d6
| 2 ||  || MBA-O || 17.1 || 2.1 km || multiple || 2003–2020 || 27 Jan 2020 || 101 || align=left | Disc.: LONEOSAlt.: 2003 TH59, 2019 SS11 || 
|- id="2003 UA383" bgcolor=#E9E9E9
| – ||  || MBA-M || 19.8 || data-sort-value="0.33" | 330 m || single || 4 days || 23 Oct 2003 || 6 || align=left | Disc.: SDSS || 
|- id="2003 UE383" bgcolor=#fefefe
| 0 ||  || MBA-I || 19.23 || data-sort-value="0.42" | 420 m || multiple || 2003–2021 || 06 Nov 2021 || 44 || align=left | Disc.: SDSSAdded on 5 November 2021 || 
|- id="2003 UJ383" bgcolor=#fefefe
| 0 ||  || MBA-I || 18.8 || data-sort-value="0.52" | 520 m || multiple || 1996–2020 || 13 Sep 2020 || 46 || align=left | Disc.: SDSS || 
|- id="2003 UP383" bgcolor=#fefefe
| 0 ||  || MBA-I || 18.5 || data-sort-value="0.59" | 590 m || multiple || 2003–2020 || 12 Jul 2020 || 50 || align=left | Disc.: SDSS || 
|- id="2003 UT383" bgcolor=#E9E9E9
| 0 ||  || MBA-M || 16.7 || 1.4 km || multiple || 2003–2021 || 05 Jan 2021 || 149 || align=left | Disc.: SDSSAlt.: 2005 AT36, 2008 YV3 || 
|- id="2003 UU383" bgcolor=#E9E9E9
| 0 ||  || MBA-M || 18.7 || data-sort-value="0.54" | 540 m || multiple || 2003–2020 || 24 Dec 2020 || 34 || align=left | Disc.: SDSSAlt.: 2007 RP198 || 
|- id="2003 UV383" bgcolor=#E9E9E9
| 0 ||  || MBA-M || 18.44 || 1.1 km || multiple || 2003–2021 || 24 Nov 2021 || 65 || align=left | Disc.: SDSS || 
|- id="2003 UX383" bgcolor=#d6d6d6
| 0 ||  || MBA-O || 17.2 || 2.0 km || multiple || 2003–2020 || 18 Dec 2020 || 109 || align=left | Disc.: SDSSAlt.: 2014 WR250, 2016 CD237 || 
|- id="2003 UB384" bgcolor=#d6d6d6
| 0 ||  || MBA-O || 17.5 || 1.8 km || multiple || 2003–2021 || 04 Jan 2021 || 37 || align=left | Disc.: SDSS || 
|- id="2003 UC384" bgcolor=#d6d6d6
| 0 ||  || MBA-O || 16.8 || 2.4 km || multiple || 2003–2020 || 25 Oct 2020 || 30 || align=left | Disc.: SDSS || 
|- id="2003 UD384" bgcolor=#E9E9E9
| 0 ||  || MBA-M || 19.0 || data-sort-value="0.67" | 670 m || multiple || 2003–2020 || 07 Nov 2020 || 36 || align=left | Disc.: SDSSAlt.: 2020 PW33 || 
|- id="2003 UE384" bgcolor=#E9E9E9
| 0 ||  || MBA-M || 17.6 || 1.7 km || multiple || 2003–2020 || 22 Apr 2020 || 31 || align=left | Disc.: SDSS || 
|- id="2003 UF384" bgcolor=#d6d6d6
| 0 ||  || MBA-O || 16.6 || 2.7 km || multiple || 2003–2020 || 17 Oct 2020 || 83 || align=left | Disc.: SDSSAlt.: 2014 RR14 || 
|- id="2003 UK384" bgcolor=#E9E9E9
| 0 ||  || MBA-M || 18.5 || data-sort-value="0.84" | 840 m || multiple || 2003–2020 || 18 Oct 2020 || 51 || align=left | Disc.: SDSS || 
|- id="2003 UL384" bgcolor=#E9E9E9
| 0 ||  || MBA-M || 17.44 || 1.4 km || multiple || 2003–2022 || 27 Jan 2022 || 93 || align=left | Disc.: SDSSAdded on 22 July 2020 || 
|- id="2003 UM384" bgcolor=#d6d6d6
| 0 ||  || MBA-O || 17.3 || 1.9 km || multiple || 2003–2020 || 21 Jan 2020 || 64 || align=left | Disc.: SDSS || 
|- id="2003 UN384" bgcolor=#E9E9E9
| 0 ||  || MBA-M || 17.6 || 1.3 km || multiple || 2003–2020 || 12 Sep 2020 || 79 || align=left | Disc.: SDSS || 
|- id="2003 UP384" bgcolor=#fefefe
| – ||  || MBA-I || 19.8 || data-sort-value="0.33" | 330 m || single || 4 days || 23 Oct 2003 || 6 || align=left | Disc.: SDSS || 
|- id="2003 US384" bgcolor=#d6d6d6
| 0 ||  || MBA-O || 17.1 || 2.1 km || multiple || 2003–2019 || 26 Nov 2019 || 37 || align=left | Disc.: SDSS || 
|- id="2003 UX384" bgcolor=#E9E9E9
| 3 ||  || MBA-M || 18.4 || 1.2 km || multiple || 2003–2017 || 09 Dec 2017 || 26 || align=left | Disc.: SDSSAlt.: 2017 XB47 || 
|- id="2003 UZ384" bgcolor=#d6d6d6
| 0 ||  || MBA-O || 17.2 || 2.0 km || multiple || 2003–2021 || 16 Jan 2021 || 42 || align=left | Disc.: SDSS || 
|- id="2003 UC385" bgcolor=#d6d6d6
| 2 ||  || HIL || 16.9 || 2.3 km || multiple || 2003–2019 || 24 Dec 2019 || 37 || align=left | Disc.: SDSS || 
|- id="2003 UF385" bgcolor=#d6d6d6
| 3 ||  || MBA-O || 18.1 || 1.3 km || multiple || 2003–2018 || 03 Nov 2018 || 42 || align=left | Disc.: SDSSAlt.: 2008 UE86 || 
|- id="2003 UG385" bgcolor=#E9E9E9
| 0 ||  || MBA-M || 17.4 || data-sort-value="0.98" | 980 m || multiple || 2003–2021 || 22 Jan 2021 || 114 || align=left | Disc.: SDSS || 
|- id="2003 UJ385" bgcolor=#E9E9E9
| 0 ||  || MBA-M || 17.8 || data-sort-value="0.82" | 820 m || multiple || 2003–2020 || 17 Dec 2020 || 24 || align=left | Disc.: SDSSAlt.: 2007 RA255 || 
|- id="2003 UL385" bgcolor=#E9E9E9
| 0 ||  || MBA-M || 18.3 || data-sort-value="0.65" | 650 m || multiple || 2003–2019 || 28 Oct 2019 || 42 || align=left | Disc.: SDSS || 
|- id="2003 UO385" bgcolor=#E9E9E9
| 2 ||  || MBA-M || 19.0 || data-sort-value="0.67" | 670 m || multiple || 2003–2020 || 14 Nov 2020 || 28 || align=left | Disc.: SDSS || 
|- id="2003 UT385" bgcolor=#E9E9E9
| 0 ||  || MBA-M || 17.47 || 1.8 km || multiple || 2003–2021 || 13 Jul 2021 || 64 || align=left | Disc.: SDSS || 
|- id="2003 UV385" bgcolor=#E9E9E9
| 0 ||  || MBA-M || 17.68 || 1.6 km || multiple || 2003–2021 || 06 Nov 2021 || 60 || align=left | Disc.: SDSSAdded on 22 July 2020 || 
|- id="2003 UX385" bgcolor=#E9E9E9
| 0 ||  || MBA-M || 17.79 || 1.2 km || multiple || 2003–2021 || 07 Nov 2021 || 45 || align=left | Disc.: SDSSAdded on 13 September 2020 || 
|- id="2003 UZ385" bgcolor=#fefefe
| 0 ||  || MBA-I || 18.36 || data-sort-value="0.63" | 630 m || multiple || 2001–2021 || 28 Sep 2021 || 67 || align=left | Disc.: SDSS || 
|- id="2003 UF386" bgcolor=#fefefe
| 0 ||  || HUN || 18.5 || data-sort-value="0.59" | 590 m || multiple || 2003–2020 || 11 Dec 2020 || 63 || align=left | Disc.: SDSS || 
|- id="2003 UJ386" bgcolor=#E9E9E9
| 1 ||  || MBA-M || 18.30 || 1.2 km || multiple || 2003–2021 || 06 Oct 2021 || 48 || align=left | Disc.: SDSSAdded on 5 November 2021 || 
|- id="2003 UL386" bgcolor=#E9E9E9
| 0 ||  || MBA-M || 17.90 || 1.1 km || multiple || 2003–2021 || 26 Nov 2021 || 43 || align=left | Disc.: SDSSAlt.: 2012 UA52, 2014 DH90 || 
|- id="2003 UM386" bgcolor=#E9E9E9
| 0 ||  || MBA-M || 17.8 || data-sort-value="0.82" | 820 m || multiple || 2003–2021 || 09 Jan 2021 || 66 || align=left | Disc.: SDSS || 
|- id="2003 UO386" bgcolor=#d6d6d6
| 0 ||  || MBA-O || 16.07 || 3.4 km || multiple || 2003–2021 || 10 Nov 2021 || 72 || align=left | Disc.: SDSS || 
|- id="2003 UQ386" bgcolor=#d6d6d6
| 0 ||  || MBA-O || 17.7 || 1.6 km || multiple || 2003–2020 || 27 Jan 2020 || 36 || align=left | Disc.: SDSSAdded on 22 July 2020Alt.: 2015 AT228 || 
|- id="2003 US386" bgcolor=#fefefe
| 0 ||  || MBA-I || 19.43 || data-sort-value="0.39" | 390 m || multiple || 2003–2022 || 25 Jan 2022 || 69 || align=left | Disc.: SDSSAlt.: 2010 TV124 || 
|- id="2003 UU386" bgcolor=#E9E9E9
| 1 ||  || MBA-M || 18.9 || data-sort-value="0.49" | 490 m || multiple || 2003–2019 || 28 Nov 2019 || 50 || align=left | Disc.: SDSSAlt.: 2007 TN340 || 
|- id="2003 UW386" bgcolor=#E9E9E9
| 0 ||  || MBA-M || 18.62 || data-sort-value="0.56" | 560 m || multiple || 2003–2021 || 15 Apr 2021 || 50 || align=left | Disc.: SDSSAdded on 22 July 2020Alt.: 2017 FW131 || 
|- id="2003 UA387" bgcolor=#d6d6d6
| 0 ||  || MBA-O || 17.4 || 1.8 km || multiple || 2003–2019 || 03 Oct 2019 || 62 || align=left | Disc.: SDSS || 
|- id="2003 UD387" bgcolor=#fefefe
| 0 ||  || MBA-I || 19.3 || data-sort-value="0.41" | 410 m || multiple || 2003–2020 || 19 Oct 2020 || 24 || align=left | Disc.: SDSSAdded on 17 January 2021 || 
|- id="2003 UF387" bgcolor=#d6d6d6
| 0 ||  || MBA-O || 16.6 || 2.7 km || multiple || 2003–2021 || 04 Jan 2021 || 124 || align=left | Disc.: SDSS || 
|- id="2003 UK387" bgcolor=#d6d6d6
| 0 ||  || MBA-O || 16.7 || 2.5 km || multiple || 2003–2019 || 08 Nov 2019 || 116 || align=left | Disc.: SDSSAlt.: 2014 WW422 || 
|- id="2003 UL387" bgcolor=#d6d6d6
| 0 ||  || MBA-O || 17.18 || 2.0 km || multiple || 2003–2021 || 28 Nov 2021 || 38 || align=left | Disc.: SDSSAdded on 19 October 2020 || 
|- id="2003 UM387" bgcolor=#d6d6d6
| 0 ||  || MBA-O || 16.18 || 3.2 km || multiple || 2003–2021 || 08 Dec 2021 || 145 || align=left | Disc.: SDSSAlt.: 2010 BX25 || 
|- id="2003 UP387" bgcolor=#E9E9E9
| 0 ||  || MBA-M || 17.98 || 1.4 km || multiple || 2003–2021 || 10 Nov 2021 || 45 || align=left | Disc.: SDSS || 
|- id="2003 UQ387" bgcolor=#fefefe
| 0 ||  || MBA-I || 18.47 || data-sort-value="0.60" | 600 m || multiple || 2003–2022 || 26 Jan 2022 || 53 || align=left | Disc.: SDSS || 
|- id="2003 UR387" bgcolor=#fefefe
| 0 ||  || MBA-I || 18.6 || data-sort-value="0.57" | 570 m || multiple || 2003–2020 || 12 Sep 2020 || 66 || align=left | Disc.: SDSSAlt.: 2015 BJ478 || 
|- id="2003 UV387" bgcolor=#E9E9E9
| 0 ||  || MBA-M || 17.14 || 2.1 km || multiple || 2003–2021 || 28 Oct 2021 || 42 || align=left | Disc.: SDSSAdded on 30 September 2021 || 
|- id="2003 UX387" bgcolor=#E9E9E9
| 0 ||  || MBA-M || 18.0 || 1.1 km || multiple || 2003–2020 || 17 Sep 2020 || 64 || align=left | Disc.: Kitt Peak Obs.Alt.: 2018 FV22 || 
|- id="2003 UZ387" bgcolor=#d6d6d6
| 0 ||  || MBA-O || 17.4 || 1.8 km || multiple || 2003–2019 || 26 Nov 2019 || 25 || align=left | Disc.: SDSSAdded on 17 January 2021 || 
|- id="2003 UA388" bgcolor=#fefefe
| 2 ||  || MBA-I || 19.4 || data-sort-value="0.39" | 390 m || multiple || 2003–2019 || 28 Nov 2019 || 18 || align=left | Disc.: SDSS || 
|- id="2003 UB388" bgcolor=#d6d6d6
| 0 ||  || MBA-O || 16.6 || 2.7 km || multiple || 2003–2021 || 06 Jan 2021 || 93 || align=left | Disc.: SDSSAlt.: 2015 XC127 || 
|- id="2003 UE388" bgcolor=#d6d6d6
| 0 ||  || MBA-O || 16.6 || 2.7 km || multiple || 2003–2019 || 28 Nov 2019 || 130 || align=left | Disc.: SpacewatchAlt.: 2010 EZ26, 2016 AN162, 2017 HL34 || 
|- id="2003 UK388" bgcolor=#fefefe
| 0 ||  || MBA-I || 18.83 || data-sort-value="0.51" | 510 m || multiple || 2003–2021 || 10 Nov 2021 || 49 || align=left | Disc.: SDSSAdded on 22 July 2020Alt.: 2014 WX458 || 
|- id="2003 UL388" bgcolor=#d6d6d6
| 0 ||  || MBA-O || 16.7 || 2.5 km || multiple || 2003–2021 || 18 Jan 2021 || 96 || align=left | Disc.: SDSSAlt.: 2014 WL108 || 
|- id="2003 UP388" bgcolor=#E9E9E9
| 1 ||  || MBA-M || 18.26 || data-sort-value="0.94" | 940 m || multiple || 2003–2021 || 08 Dec 2021 || 46 || align=left | Disc.: SDSS || 
|- id="2003 US388" bgcolor=#E9E9E9
| 3 ||  || MBA-M || 17.6 || 1.3 km || multiple || 2003–2020 || 14 Dec 2020 || 54 || align=left | Disc.: SpacewatchAdded on 17 January 2021 || 
|- id="2003 UU388" bgcolor=#fefefe
| 0 ||  || MBA-I || 18.80 || data-sort-value="0.52" | 520 m || multiple || 2003–2021 || 27 Nov 2021 || 55 || align=left | Disc.: SpacewatchAdded on 5 November 2021Alt.: 2021 RB70 || 
|- id="2003 UZ388" bgcolor=#fefefe
| 0 ||  || MBA-I || 18.59 || data-sort-value="0.57" | 570 m || multiple || 2003–2021 || 08 Sep 2021 || 48 || align=left | Disc.: SDSSAlt.: 2014 SL134 || 
|- id="2003 UA389" bgcolor=#E9E9E9
| 0 ||  || MBA-M || 16.71 || 2.5 km || multiple || 1994–2021 || 30 Oct 2021 || 199 || align=left | Disc.: SDSSAlt.: 2006 GG6, 2007 MM10, 2015 DS152 || 
|- id="2003 UB389" bgcolor=#d6d6d6
| 0 ||  || MBA-O || 16.7 || 2.5 km || multiple || 2003–2021 || 04 Jan 2021 || 76 || align=left | Disc.: SDSS || 
|- id="2003 UD389" bgcolor=#d6d6d6
| 0 ||  || MBA-O || 17.2 || 2.0 km || multiple || 2001–2020 || 07 Dec 2020 || 68 || align=left | Disc.: SDSSAlt.: 2014 RA14 || 
|- id="2003 UE389" bgcolor=#d6d6d6
| 0 ||  || MBA-O || 16.9 || 2.3 km || multiple || 2003–2019 || 29 Oct 2019 || 68 || align=left | Disc.: SDSS || 
|- id="2003 UF389" bgcolor=#E9E9E9
| 3 ||  || MBA-M || 18.6 || data-sort-value="0.80" | 800 m || multiple || 2003–2020 || 20 Oct 2020 || 37 || align=left | Disc.: SDSSAdded on 17 January 2021 || 
|- id="2003 UG389" bgcolor=#E9E9E9
| 0 ||  || MBA-M || 17.91 || 1.5 km || multiple || 2003–2021 || 06 Oct 2021 || 55 || align=left | Disc.: SDSS || 
|- id="2003 UH389" bgcolor=#d6d6d6
| 1 ||  || MBA-O || 17.4 || 1.8 km || multiple || 2003–2020 || 10 Dec 2020 || 52 || align=left | Disc.: SDSS || 
|- id="2003 UL389" bgcolor=#E9E9E9
| 0 ||  || MBA-M || 18.43 || 1.1 km || multiple || 2003–2021 || 08 Sep 2021 || 54 || align=left | Disc.: SDSSAdded on 21 August 2021 || 
|- id="2003 UQ389" bgcolor=#E9E9E9
| 0 ||  || MBA-M || 17.78 || 1.5 km || multiple || 2003–2021 || 09 Sep 2021 || 63 || align=left | Disc.: SDSS || 
|- id="2003 UR389" bgcolor=#fefefe
| 0 ||  || MBA-I || 17.7 || data-sort-value="0.86" | 860 m || multiple || 2003–2020 || 23 Jan 2020 || 76 || align=left | Disc.: SDSSAdded on 22 July 2020Alt.: 2007 VU377 || 
|- id="2003 UT389" bgcolor=#d6d6d6
| 0 ||  || MBA-O || 17.28 || 1.9 km || multiple || 2003–2021 || 11 Nov 2021 || 35 || align=left | Disc.: SDSSAdded on 17 January 2021 || 
|- id="2003 UY389" bgcolor=#d6d6d6
| 0 ||  || MBA-O || 16.97 || 2.2 km || multiple || 2003–2021 || 30 Jul 2021 || 141 || align=left | Disc.: SDSSAlt.: 2017 PV9, 2017 RK79 || 
|- id="2003 UA390" bgcolor=#E9E9E9
| 1 ||  || MBA-M || 18.50 || 1.1 km || multiple || 2003–2021 || 31 Oct 2021 || 37 || align=left | Disc.: SDSSAdded on 5 November 2021 || 
|- id="2003 UF390" bgcolor=#E9E9E9
| 0 ||  || MBA-M || 17.2 || 1.5 km || multiple || 1999–2021 || 06 Jan 2021 || 130 || align=left | Disc.: SDSSAlt.: 2015 OJ55, 2017 BE61 || 
|- id="2003 UL390" bgcolor=#fefefe
| 0 ||  || MBA-I || 18.70 || data-sort-value="0.54" | 540 m || multiple || 2003–2021 || 10 Feb 2021 || 54 || align=left | Disc.: SDSSAdded on 5 November 2021 || 
|- id="2003 UM390" bgcolor=#fefefe
| 0 ||  || MBA-I || 17.85 || data-sort-value="0.80" | 800 m || multiple || 2003–2021 || 11 May 2021 || 80 || align=left | Disc.: SDSSAlt.: 2013 EV8 || 
|- id="2003 UN390" bgcolor=#E9E9E9
| 1 ||  || MBA-M || 18.9 || data-sort-value="0.49" | 490 m || multiple || 2003–2015 || 03 Oct 2015 || 29 || align=left | Disc.: SDSSAlt.: 2015 PV79 || 
|- id="2003 UP390" bgcolor=#E9E9E9
| 0 ||  || MBA-M || 17.84 || 1.1 km || multiple || 2003–2022 || 06 Jan 2022 || 59 || align=left | Disc.: SDSS || 
|- id="2003 UQ390" bgcolor=#d6d6d6
| 0 ||  || MBA-O || 17.2 || 2.0 km || multiple || 2003–2021 || 19 Mar 2021 || 48 || align=left | Disc.: SDSS || 
|- id="2003 UR390" bgcolor=#fefefe
| 0 ||  || MBA-I || 18.9 || data-sort-value="0.49" | 490 m || multiple || 2003–2019 || 06 Jul 2019 || 28 || align=left | Disc.: SDSSAdded on 17 January 2021 || 
|- id="2003 US390" bgcolor=#d6d6d6
| 1 ||  || MBA-O || 17.7 || 1.6 km || multiple || 2003–2019 || 21 Oct 2019 || 21 || align=left | Disc.: SDSS || 
|- id="2003 UX390" bgcolor=#fefefe
| 0 ||  || MBA-I || 18.9 || data-sort-value="0.49" | 490 m || multiple || 2003–2020 || 08 Dec 2020 || 39 || align=left | Disc.: SDSS || 
|- id="2003 UY390" bgcolor=#d6d6d6
| 0 ||  || MBA-O || 16.80 || 2.4 km || multiple || 2003–2022 || 07 Jan 2022 || 142 || align=left | Disc.: SDSSAlt.: 2010 DA69, 2014 QL292 || 
|- id="2003 UZ390" bgcolor=#d6d6d6
| 0 ||  || MBA-O || 17.0 || 2.2 km || multiple || 2003–2020 || 20 Oct 2020 || 35 || align=left | Disc.: SDSSAdded on 17 June 2021Alt.: 2020 SO62 || 
|- id="2003 UB391" bgcolor=#fefefe
| 0 ||  || MBA-I || 18.5 || data-sort-value="0.59" | 590 m || multiple || 2003–2020 || 16 Sep 2020 || 77 || align=left | Disc.: SDSSAdded on 24 August 2020 || 
|- id="2003 UC391" bgcolor=#E9E9E9
| 0 ||  || MBA-M || 17.9 || data-sort-value="0.78" | 780 m || multiple || 2003–2020 || 18 Dec 2020 || 36 || align=left | Disc.: SDSS || 
|- id="2003 UE391" bgcolor=#d6d6d6
| 0 ||  || MBA-O || 17.2 || 2.0 km || multiple || 2003–2020 || 22 Mar 2020 || 64 || align=left | Disc.: SDSSAlt.: 2013 YN103 || 
|- id="2003 UP391" bgcolor=#d6d6d6
| 0 ||  || MBA-O || 16.6 || 2.7 km || multiple || 2003–2021 || 10 Jan 2021 || 94 || align=left | Disc.: SDSS || 
|- id="2003 UV391" bgcolor=#E9E9E9
| 1 ||  || MBA-M || 17.9 || data-sort-value="0.78" | 780 m || multiple || 2003–2019 || 28 Sep 2019 || 47 || align=left | Disc.: SDSS || 
|- id="2003 UY391" bgcolor=#E9E9E9
| 1 ||  || MBA-M || 18.3 || 1.2 km || multiple || 2003–2018 || 05 Jan 2018 || 63 || align=left | Disc.: SDSS || 
|- id="2003 UZ391" bgcolor=#fefefe
| 0 ||  || MBA-I || 18.3 || data-sort-value="0.65" | 650 m || multiple || 2003–2020 || 05 Mar 2020 || 45 || align=left | Disc.: SDSS || 
|- id="2003 UC392" bgcolor=#fefefe
| 3 ||  || MBA-I || 18.8 || data-sort-value="0.52" | 520 m || multiple || 2003–2021 || 30 Nov 2021 || 39 || align=left | Disc.: SDSS || 
|- id="2003 UD392" bgcolor=#d6d6d6
| 0 ||  || MBA-O || 17.48 || 1.8 km || multiple || 2003–2021 || 15 Apr 2021 || 48 || align=left | Disc.: SDSSAlt.: 2015 AJ172 || 
|- id="2003 UN392" bgcolor=#d6d6d6
| 0 ||  || MBA-O || 16.5 || 2.8 km || multiple || 2003–2020 || 08 Dec 2020 || 108 || align=left | Disc.: SDSSAlt.: 2008 SZ69 || 
|- id="2003 UO392" bgcolor=#d6d6d6
| 0 ||  || MBA-O || 17.0 || 2.2 km || multiple || 2003–2019 || 24 Dec 2019 || 58 || align=left | Disc.: SDSSAdded on 11 May 2021Alt.: 2014 WQ327 || 
|- id="2003 UP392" bgcolor=#d6d6d6
| 2 ||  || MBA-O || 17.2 || 2.0 km || multiple || 2003–2019 || 26 Nov 2019 || 28 || align=left | Disc.: SDSS || 
|- id="2003 UR392" bgcolor=#d6d6d6
| 0 ||  || MBA-O || 17.3 || 1.9 km || multiple || 2003–2019 || 28 Sep 2019 || 25 || align=left | Disc.: SDSS || 
|- id="2003 UT392" bgcolor=#d6d6d6
| 0 ||  || MBA-O || 16.9 || 2.3 km || multiple || 2003–2020 || 17 Nov 2020 || 40 || align=left | Disc.: SDSSAdded on 17 January 2021Alt.: 2014 SV201 || 
|- id="2003 UU392" bgcolor=#d6d6d6
| – ||  || MBA-O || 17.9 || 1.5 km || single || 2 days || 24 Oct 2003 || 6 || align=left | Disc.: SDSS || 
|- id="2003 UA393" bgcolor=#d6d6d6
| 0 ||  || MBA-O || 16.9 || 2.3 km || multiple || 2003–2018 || 12 Oct 2018 || 54 || align=left | Disc.: SDSS || 
|- id="2003 UC393" bgcolor=#E9E9E9
| 4 ||  || MBA-M || 18.2 || data-sort-value="0.96" | 960 m || multiple || 2003–2011 || 01 Aug 2011 || 18 || align=left | Disc.: Kitt Peak Obs.Alt.: 2011 OM47 || 
|- id="2003 UD393" bgcolor=#E9E9E9
| 3 ||  || MBA-M || 19.0 || data-sort-value="0.47" | 470 m || multiple || 2003–2019 || 29 Oct 2019 || 41 || align=left | Disc.: SDSS || 
|- id="2003 UE393" bgcolor=#d6d6d6
| 0 ||  || MBA-O || 16.6 || 2.7 km || multiple || 2003–2019 || 03 Nov 2019 || 53 || align=left | Disc.: SDSSAdded on 22 July 2020Alt.: 2008 TE81 || 
|- id="2003 UF393" bgcolor=#fefefe
| 0 ||  || MBA-I || 18.29 || data-sort-value="0.65" | 650 m || multiple || 2003–2021 || 01 Oct 2021 || 56 || align=left | Disc.: SDSSAlt.: 2014 WP253 || 
|- id="2003 UH393" bgcolor=#d6d6d6
| 0 ||  || MBA-O || 16.91 || 2.3 km || multiple || 2003–2022 || 26 Jan 2022 || 63 || align=left | Disc.: SDSS || 
|- id="2003 UL393" bgcolor=#d6d6d6
| 0 ||  || MBA-O || 17.0 || 2.2 km || multiple || 2003–2021 || 07 Jun 2021 || 87 || align=left | Disc.: SDSSAlt.: 2010 HN37, 2015 AL250 || 
|- id="2003 UO393" bgcolor=#E9E9E9
| 0 ||  || MBA-M || 18.4 || data-sort-value="0.62" | 620 m || multiple || 2001–2016 || 23 Dec 2016 || 54 || align=left | Disc.: SDSSAlt.: 2011 RY4 || 
|- id="2003 UQ393" bgcolor=#d6d6d6
| 0 ||  || MBA-O || 16.8 || 2.4 km || multiple || 2003–2021 || 15 Jan 2021 || 40 || align=left | Disc.: SDSS || 
|- id="2003 US393" bgcolor=#d6d6d6
| 4 ||  || MBA-O || 17.8 || 1.5 km || multiple || 2003–2018 || 07 Sep 2018 || 17 || align=left | Disc.: SDSS || 
|- id="2003 UV393" bgcolor=#E9E9E9
| 0 ||  || MBA-M || 17.7 || 1.2 km || multiple || 2003–2020 || 16 Oct 2020 || 47 || align=left | Disc.: SDSS || 
|- id="2003 UX393" bgcolor=#fefefe
| 0 ||  || MBA-I || 18.6 || data-sort-value="0.57" | 570 m || multiple || 2003–2020 || 27 Jun 2020 || 40 || align=left | Disc.: SDSS || 
|- id="2003 UC394" bgcolor=#d6d6d6
| 0 ||  || MBA-O || 16.8 || 2.4 km || multiple || 2003–2020 || 17 Oct 2020 || 62 || align=left | Disc.: SDSSAlt.: 2014 SB23 || 
|- id="2003 UH394" bgcolor=#E9E9E9
| 0 ||  || MBA-M || 17.4 || data-sort-value="0.98" | 980 m || multiple || 2003–2021 || 05 Jan 2021 || 78 || align=left | Disc.: SDSSAlt.: 2009 DY71, 2017 BY12 || 
|- id="2003 UQ394" bgcolor=#d6d6d6
| 0 ||  || MBA-O || 17.08 || 2.1 km || multiple || 2003–2022 || 26 Jan 2022 || 70 || align=left | Disc.: SDSS || 
|- id="2003 UT394" bgcolor=#d6d6d6
| 0 ||  || MBA-O || 17.2 || 2.0 km || multiple || 2003–2020 || 11 Dec 2020 || 27 || align=left | Disc.: SDSS || 
|- id="2003 UY394" bgcolor=#d6d6d6
| 0 ||  || MBA-O || 17.1 || 2.1 km || multiple || 2003–2020 || 27 Jan 2020 || 44 || align=left | Disc.: SDSS || 
|- id="2003 UZ394" bgcolor=#d6d6d6
| 0 ||  || MBA-O || 17.4 || 1.8 km || multiple || 2003–2021 || 09 Jan 2021 || 37 || align=left | Disc.: SDSSAlt.: 2014 WB317 || 
|- id="2003 UA395" bgcolor=#d6d6d6
| 0 ||  || MBA-O || 17.49 || 1.8 km || multiple || 2003–2021 || 20 Mar 2021 || 71 || align=left | Disc.: SDSS || 
|- id="2003 UB395" bgcolor=#E9E9E9
| 0 ||  || MBA-M || 17.1 || 1.6 km || multiple || 2003–2020 || 20 Nov 2020 || 110 || align=left | Disc.: SDSS || 
|- id="2003 UC395" bgcolor=#d6d6d6
| 0 ||  || MBA-O || 17.18 || 2.0 km || multiple || 2001–2019 || 20 Dec 2019 || 42 || align=left | Disc.: SDSSAdded on 24 December 2021 || 
|- id="2003 UE395" bgcolor=#E9E9E9
| 0 ||  || MBA-M || 17.9 || 1.1 km || multiple || 2003–2020 || 07 Dec 2020 || 68 || align=left | Disc.: SDSS || 
|- id="2003 UH395" bgcolor=#d6d6d6
| 0 ||  || MBA-O || 17.39 || 1.9 km || multiple || 2003–2021 || 14 Apr 2021 || 54 || align=left | Disc.: SDSSAlt.: 2016 GG189 || 
|- id="2003 UL395" bgcolor=#E9E9E9
| 2 ||  || MBA-M || 18.1 || data-sort-value="0.71" | 710 m || multiple || 2003–2019 || 29 Oct 2019 || 18 || align=left | Disc.: SDSS || 
|- id="2003 UO395" bgcolor=#E9E9E9
| 0 ||  || MBA-M || 17.16 || 2.1 km || multiple || 2001–2021 || 02 Dec 2021 || 99 || align=left | Disc.: SDSSAlt.: 2006 KL75, 2014 DS28 || 
|- id="2003 UQ395" bgcolor=#E9E9E9
| 0 ||  || MBA-M || 17.9 || data-sort-value="0.78" | 780 m || multiple || 2001–2021 || 12 Jan 2021 || 56 || align=left | Disc.: SDSSAdded on 22 July 2020 || 
|- id="2003 UR395" bgcolor=#E9E9E9
| 0 ||  || MBA-M || 17.0 || 1.2 km || multiple || 2003–2021 || 04 Jan 2021 || 73 || align=left | Disc.: SDSS || 
|- id="2003 UD396" bgcolor=#fefefe
| 0 ||  || MBA-I || 17.4 || data-sort-value="0.98" | 980 m || multiple || 1994–2020 || 14 Sep 2020 || 81 || align=left | Disc.: SDSSAdded on 13 September 2020 || 
|- id="2003 UK396" bgcolor=#E9E9E9
| 2 ||  || MBA-M || 19.1 || data-sort-value="0.45" | 450 m || multiple || 2003–2019 || 19 Dec 2019 || 79 || align=left | Disc.: SDSSAlt.: 2015 TB141 || 
|- id="2003 UL396" bgcolor=#d6d6d6
| 0 ||  || MBA-O || 16.6 || 2.7 km || multiple || 2003–2020 || 23 Jan 2020 || 66 || align=left | Disc.: SDSSAlt.: 2010 AK142 || 
|- id="2003 UO396" bgcolor=#d6d6d6
| 0 ||  || MBA-O || 16.8 || 2.4 km || multiple || 2003–2021 || 06 Jan 2021 || 45 || align=left | Disc.: SDSS || 
|- id="2003 UQ396" bgcolor=#E9E9E9
| 0 ||  || MBA-M || 17.9 || 1.1 km || multiple || 2003–2020 || 17 Nov 2020 || 25 || align=left | Disc.: SDSSAdded on 21 August 2021 || 
|- id="2003 UV396" bgcolor=#E9E9E9
| 2 ||  || MBA-M || 19.4 || data-sort-value="0.55" | 550 m || multiple || 2003–2016 || 25 Oct 2016 || 15 || align=left | Disc.: SDSS || 
|- id="2003 UW396" bgcolor=#E9E9E9
| 0 ||  || MBA-M || 17.2 || 1.5 km || multiple || 2003–2021 || 06 Jan 2021 || 87 || align=left | Disc.: SDSSAdded on 17 January 2021 || 
|- id="2003 UA397" bgcolor=#E9E9E9
| 0 ||  || MBA-M || 17.5 || data-sort-value="0.94" | 940 m || multiple || 2003–2020 || 16 Dec 2020 || 41 || align=left | Disc.: SDSSAdded on 9 March 2021 || 
|- id="2003 UB397" bgcolor=#d6d6d6
| 0 ||  || MBA-O || 16.34 || 3.0 km || multiple || 2003–2022 || 05 Jan 2022 || 110 || align=left | Disc.: SDSSAlt.: 2014 QK291, 2016 AJ82 || 
|- id="2003 UC397" bgcolor=#d6d6d6
| 0 ||  || MBA-O || 16.7 || 2.5 km || multiple || 2003–2020 || 26 Jan 2020 || 136 || align=left | Disc.: SDSSAlt.: 2008 QW22 || 
|- id="2003 UD397" bgcolor=#E9E9E9
| 0 ||  || MBA-M || 17.6 || 1.3 km || multiple || 2003–2020 || 21 Oct 2020 || 63 || align=left | Disc.: SDSSAlt.: 2015 LL16 || 
|- id="2003 UF397" bgcolor=#E9E9E9
| 0 ||  || MBA-M || 17.3 || 1.0 km || multiple || 2003–2020 || 21 Dec 2020 || 93 || align=left | Disc.: SDSSAlt.: 2011 QE20 || 
|- id="2003 UL397" bgcolor=#d6d6d6
| 0 ||  || MBA-O || 16.8 || 2.4 km || multiple || 2003–2021 || 07 Jun 2021 || 115 || align=left | Disc.: SDSSAlt.: 2005 EB350, 2015 BH423 || 
|- id="2003 UM397" bgcolor=#E9E9E9
| 0 ||  || MBA-M || 17.8 || 1.2 km || multiple || 2003–2021 || 07 Jan 2021 || 65 || align=left | Disc.: SDSSAlt.: 2009 DD38 || 
|- id="2003 UN397" bgcolor=#d6d6d6
| 2 ||  || MBA-O || 16.9 || 2.3 km || multiple || 2003–2020 || 06 Dec 2020 || 42 || align=left | Disc.: SDSSAdded on 11 May 2021Alt.: 2009 XC30 || 
|- id="2003 UV397" bgcolor=#d6d6d6
| 0 ||  || MBA-O || 16.9 || 2.3 km || multiple || 2003–2019 || 24 Dec 2019 || 47 || align=left | Disc.: SDSSAlt.: 2010 AL52 || 
|- id="2003 UX397" bgcolor=#E9E9E9
| 0 ||  || MBA-M || 17.4 || data-sort-value="0.98" | 980 m || multiple || 2003–2021 || 17 Jan 2021 || 41 || align=left | Disc.: SDSS || 
|- id="2003 UY397" bgcolor=#E9E9E9
| 2 ||  || MBA-M || 18.0 || 1.1 km || multiple || 2003–2020 || 20 Dec 2020 || 41 || align=left | Disc.: SDSSAdded on 17 January 2021 || 
|- id="2003 UZ397" bgcolor=#d6d6d6
| 0 ||  || MBA-O || 16.21 || 3.2 km || multiple || 2003–2022 || 27 Jan 2022 || 187 || align=left | Disc.: SDSSAlt.: 2008 PD14, 2010 EG167 || 
|- id="2003 UA398" bgcolor=#E9E9E9
| 0 ||  || MBA-M || 17.89 || 1.5 km || multiple || 2003–2021 || 04 Dec 2021 || 51 || align=left | Disc.: SDSSAdded on 24 December 2021 || 
|- id="2003 UB398" bgcolor=#d6d6d6
| 0 ||  || MBA-O || 16.55 || 2.7 km || multiple || 2003–2021 || 03 May 2021 || 137 || align=left | Disc.: SDSS || 
|- id="2003 UD398" bgcolor=#d6d6d6
| 0 ||  || MBA-O || 15.97 || 3.6 km || multiple || 2003–2022 || 08 Jan 2022 || 202 || align=left | Disc.: SDSSAlt.: 2010 DA24 || 
|- id="2003 UF398" bgcolor=#d6d6d6
| 0 ||  || MBA-O || 16.9 || 2.3 km || multiple || 2003–2020 || 08 Dec 2020 || 74 || align=left | Disc.: SDSS || 
|- id="2003 UG398" bgcolor=#d6d6d6
| 0 ||  || MBA-O || 16.8 || 2.4 km || multiple || 2003–2020 || 07 Dec 2020 || 40 || align=left | Disc.: SDSS || 
|- id="2003 UK398" bgcolor=#FA8072
| 0 ||  || MCA || 19.08 || data-sort-value="0.45" | 450 m || multiple || 2003–2021 || 29 Nov 2021 || 31 || align=left | Disc.: SDSSAdded on 21 August 2021 || 
|- id="2003 UN398" bgcolor=#E9E9E9
| 0 ||  || MBA-M || 17.6 || data-sort-value="0.90" | 900 m || multiple || 2003–2021 || 07 Jan 2021 || 64 || align=left | Disc.: SDSS || 
|- id="2003 UR398" bgcolor=#E9E9E9
| 1 ||  || MBA-M || 18.2 || data-sort-value="0.96" | 960 m || multiple || 2003–2020 || 14 Sep 2020 || 39 || align=left | Disc.: SDSS || 
|- id="2003 UT398" bgcolor=#d6d6d6
| 0 ||  || MBA-O || 17.0 || 2.2 km || multiple || 2003–2021 || 15 Jan 2021 || 48 || align=left | Disc.: SDSSAdded on 22 July 2020 || 
|- id="2003 UV398" bgcolor=#E9E9E9
| 1 ||  || MBA-M || 18.5 || data-sort-value="0.59" | 590 m || multiple || 2003–2019 || 26 Sep 2019 || 41 || align=left | Disc.: SDSS || 
|- id="2003 UY398" bgcolor=#E9E9E9
| 1 ||  || MBA-M || 18.34 || 1.2 km || multiple || 2003–2021 || 23 Nov 2021 || 35 || align=left | Disc.: SDSSAdded on 5 November 2021 || 
|- id="2003 UA399" bgcolor=#E9E9E9
| 0 ||  || MBA-M || 16.57 || 2.7 km || multiple || 2003–2021 || 03 Dec 2021 || 264 || align=left | Disc.: SDSSAlt.: 2011 OX51, 2015 DN210 || 
|- id="2003 UB399" bgcolor=#E9E9E9
| 1 ||  || MBA-M || 17.8 || 1.2 km || multiple || 2003–2021 || 04 Jan 2021 || 60 || align=left | Disc.: SDSS || 
|- id="2003 UH399" bgcolor=#E9E9E9
| 0 ||  || MBA-M || 18.0 || 1.1 km || multiple || 2003–2021 || 05 Jan 2021 || 38 || align=left | Disc.: SDSSAdded on 11 May 2021Alt.: 2013 AL176 || 
|- id="2003 UJ399" bgcolor=#d6d6d6
| 0 ||  || MBA-O || 16.3 || 3.1 km || multiple || 2003–2021 || 04 Jan 2021 || 122 || align=left | Disc.: SDSSAlt.: 2010 CX267 || 
|- id="2003 UQ399" bgcolor=#E9E9E9
| 0 ||  || MBA-M || 17.6 || 1.3 km || multiple || 2003–2020 || 14 Sep 2020 || 62 || align=left | Disc.: SDSS || 
|- id="2003 UW399" bgcolor=#E9E9E9
| 0 ||  || MBA-M || 17.23 || 1.5 km || multiple || 2003–2022 || 25 Jan 2022 || 165 || align=left | Disc.: Spacewatch || 
|- id="2003 UN400" bgcolor=#E9E9E9
| 0 ||  || MBA-M || 17.00 || 1.7 km || multiple || 1995–2021 || 30 Nov 2021 || 140 || align=left | Disc.: SDSS || 
|- id="2003 UT400" bgcolor=#E9E9E9
| 1 ||  || MBA-M || 17.3 || 1.0 km || multiple || 2003–2020 || 08 Dec 2020 || 59 || align=left | Disc.: SDSS || 
|- id="2003 UX400" bgcolor=#E9E9E9
| 0 ||  || MBA-M || 17.20 || 1.5 km || multiple || 2003–2021 || 30 Nov 2021 || 106 || align=left | Disc.: SDSSAlt.: 2015 KE5, 2016 QV57 || 
|- id="2003 UF401" bgcolor=#E9E9E9
| 0 ||  || MBA-M || 17.08 || 1.1 km || multiple || 2003–2022 || 26 Jan 2022 || 61 || align=left | Disc.: SDSS || 
|- id="2003 UL401" bgcolor=#fefefe
| 2 ||  || MBA-I || 19.0 || data-sort-value="0.47" | 470 m || multiple || 2003–2017 || 14 Sep 2017 || 32 || align=left | Disc.: SDSSAdded on 17 January 2021Alt.: 2017 PW15 || 
|- id="2003 UM401" bgcolor=#E9E9E9
| 1 ||  || MBA-M || 18.2 || data-sort-value="0.96" | 960 m || multiple || 2003–2020 || 15 Oct 2020 || 99 || align=left | Disc.: SDSSAdded on 17 January 2021Alt.: 2016 SH69 || 
|- id="2003 UR401" bgcolor=#E9E9E9
| – ||  || MBA-M || 19.4 || data-sort-value="0.39" | 390 m || single || 36 days || 24 Oct 2003 || 13 || align=left | Disc.: SDSS || 
|- id="2003 UV401" bgcolor=#d6d6d6
| 1 ||  || MBA-O || 17.3 || 1.9 km || multiple || 2003–2019 || 02 Dec 2019 || 30 || align=left | Disc.: SDSS || 
|- id="2003 UW401" bgcolor=#E9E9E9
| 4 ||  || MBA-M || 18.4 || data-sort-value="0.88" | 880 m || multiple || 2003–2012 || 10 Dec 2012 || 16 || align=left | Disc.: LPL/Spacewatch IIAdded on 5 November 2021Alt.: 2012 XV174 || 
|- id="2003 UX401" bgcolor=#d6d6d6
| 1 ||  || MBA-O || 17.5 || 1.8 km || multiple || 2003–2020 || 08 Dec 2020 || 65 || align=left | Disc.: SDSSAlt.: 2010 CL262 || 
|- id="2003 UJ402" bgcolor=#fefefe
| – ||  || MBA-I || 19.6 || data-sort-value="0.36" | 360 m || single || 36 days || 24 Oct 2003 || 9 || align=left | Disc.: SDSS || 
|- id="2003 UQ402" bgcolor=#fefefe
| 0 ||  || MBA-I || 18.92 || data-sort-value="0.49" | 490 m || multiple || 2003–2021 || 09 Dec 2021 || 61 || align=left | Disc.: Kitt Peak Obs.Alt.: 2006 KB138 || 
|- id="2003 UW402" bgcolor=#fefefe
| 3 ||  || MBA-I || 19.0 || data-sort-value="0.47" | 470 m || multiple || 2003–2014 || 19 Sep 2014 || 36 || align=left | Disc.: SDSSAlt.: 2014 RJ39 || 
|- id="2003 UZ402" bgcolor=#fefefe
| 1 ||  || MBA-I || 19.0 || data-sort-value="0.47" | 470 m || multiple || 2003–2018 || 17 Nov 2018 || 44 || align=left | Disc.: SDSSAlt.: 2014 QS228 || 
|- id="2003 UF403" bgcolor=#fefefe
| 0 ||  || MBA-I || 18.9 || data-sort-value="0.49" | 490 m || multiple || 2003–2018 || 10 Nov 2018 || 39 || align=left | Disc.: SDSS || 
|- id="2003 UG403" bgcolor=#d6d6d6
| 0 ||  || MBA-O || 17.31 || 2.8 km || multiple || 2003–2022 || 27 Jan 2022 || 81 || align=left | Disc.: SDSSAlt.: 2010 CP229, 2011 EB11 || 
|- id="2003 UM403" bgcolor=#fefefe
| 2 ||  || MBA-I || 18.9 || data-sort-value="0.49" | 490 m || multiple || 2003–2018 || 18 Aug 2018 || 27 || align=left | Disc.: SDSS || 
|- id="2003 UN403" bgcolor=#E9E9E9
| 1 ||  || MBA-M || 18.9 || data-sort-value="0.49" | 490 m || multiple || 2003–2019 || 15 Jun 2019 || 36 || align=left | Disc.: SDSS || 
|- id="2003 UO403" bgcolor=#E9E9E9
| 0 ||  || MBA-M || 18.62 || data-sort-value="0.79" | 790 m || multiple || 2003–2020 || 17 Oct 2020 || 34 || align=left | Disc.: SDSS || 
|- id="2003 UR403" bgcolor=#fefefe
| 0 ||  || MBA-I || 19.3 || data-sort-value="0.41" | 410 m || multiple || 2003–2020 || 16 Nov 2020 || 43 || align=left | Disc.: SDSSAdded on 17 January 2021 || 
|- id="2003 UT403" bgcolor=#E9E9E9
| 4 ||  || MBA-M || 18.9 || data-sort-value="0.49" | 490 m || multiple || 2003–2020 || 19 Dec 2020 || 17 || align=left | Disc.: SDSS || 
|- id="2003 UV403" bgcolor=#fefefe
| – ||  || MBA-I || 19.7 || data-sort-value="0.34" | 340 m || single || 28 days || 24 Oct 2003 || 8 || align=left | Disc.: SDSS || 
|- id="2003 UY403" bgcolor=#d6d6d6
| 0 ||  || MBA-O || 16.71 || 2.5 km || multiple || 2003–2021 || 03 Dec 2021 || 96 || align=left | Disc.: SDSSAlt.: 2009 SH88 || 
|- id="2003 UJ404" bgcolor=#E9E9E9
| 3 ||  || MBA-M || 18.6 || data-sort-value="0.57" | 570 m || multiple || 2003–2020 || 22 Nov 2020 || 14 || align=left | Disc.: SDSSAdded on 17 January 2021 || 
|- id="2003 UL404" bgcolor=#E9E9E9
| 0 ||  || MBA-M || 17.72 || 1.2 km || multiple || 2003–2021 || 12 Nov 2021 || 67 || align=left | Disc.: SDSS || 
|- id="2003 UO404" bgcolor=#fefefe
| 0 ||  || MBA-I || 18.3 || data-sort-value="0.65" | 650 m || multiple || 2003–2018 || 09 Nov 2018 || 39 || align=left | Disc.: SDSS || 
|- id="2003 UP404" bgcolor=#E9E9E9
| 2 ||  || MBA-M || 19.5 || data-sort-value="0.53" | 530 m || multiple || 2003–2016 || 20 Oct 2016 || 24 || align=left | Disc.: SDSSAlt.: 2016 QO100 || 
|- id="2003 US404" bgcolor=#E9E9E9
| 0 ||  || MBA-M || 17.9 || 1.1 km || multiple || 2003–2020 || 17 Oct 2020 || 34 || align=left | Disc.: SDSSAdded on 17 January 2021 || 
|- id="2003 UY404" bgcolor=#E9E9E9
| 0 ||  || MBA-M || 17.6 || data-sort-value="0.90" | 900 m || multiple || 2003–2021 || 18 Jan 2021 || 87 || align=left | Disc.: SDSSAlt.: 2015 UK38, 2017 BE27 || 
|- id="2003 UA405" bgcolor=#E9E9E9
| 0 ||  || MBA-M || 17.73 || 1.6 km || multiple || 2003–2021 || 01 Nov 2021 || 80 || align=left | Disc.: SDSS || 
|- id="2003 UB405" bgcolor=#fefefe
| 0 ||  || MBA-I || 18.73 || data-sort-value="0.53" | 530 m || multiple || 2003–2021 || 14 Sep 2021 || 43 || align=left | Disc.: SDSSAdded on 30 September 2021Alt.: 2021 PQ44 || 
|- id="2003 UG405" bgcolor=#E9E9E9
| 0 ||  || MBA-M || 17.0 || 1.2 km || multiple || 1998–2019 || 25 Nov 2019 || 165 || align=left | Disc.: SDSSAlt.: 2007 RM132, 2011 SM252, 2014 HP143 || 
|- id="2003 UL405" bgcolor=#d6d6d6
| 0 ||  || MBA-O || 16.71 || 2.5 km || multiple || 2003–2022 || 07 Jan 2022 || 154 || align=left | Disc.: SpacewatchAlt.: 2010 DN31, 2016 AG154 || 
|- id="2003 UM405" bgcolor=#fefefe
| 3 ||  || MBA-I || 18.8 || data-sort-value="0.52" | 520 m || multiple || 2003–2020 || 16 Nov 2020 || 39 || align=left | Disc.: SDSS || 
|- id="2003 UN405" bgcolor=#fefefe
| 0 ||  || MBA-I || 19.18 || data-sort-value="0.43" | 430 m || multiple || 2003–2021 || 10 Nov 2021 || 79 || align=left | Disc.: SDSS || 
|- id="2003 UP405" bgcolor=#E9E9E9
| 0 ||  || MBA-M || 17.28 || 1.9 km || multiple || 2003–2021 || 30 Nov 2021 || 131 || align=left | Disc.: SDSS || 
|- id="2003 UT405" bgcolor=#fefefe
| 2 ||  || MBA-I || 19.4 || data-sort-value="0.39" | 390 m || multiple || 2003–2020 || 10 Dec 2020 || 19 || align=left | Disc.: SDSSAdded on 21 August 2021 || 
|- id="2003 UU405" bgcolor=#fefefe
| 0 ||  || MBA-I || 18.99 || data-sort-value="0.47" | 470 m || multiple || 2003–2021 || 13 Jul 2021 || 35 || align=left | Disc.: SDSSAdded on 17 January 2021Alt.: 2012 BC78, 2018 VG124 || 
|- id="2003 UV405" bgcolor=#fefefe
| 0 ||  || MBA-I || 17.80 || data-sort-value="0.82" | 820 m || multiple || 1993–2021 || 01 Jul 2021 || 144 || align=left | Disc.: SpacewatchAlt.: 1993 BQ8, 2007 VF251, 2014 OZ131, 2015 YZ8 || 
|- id="2003 UX405" bgcolor=#E9E9E9
| 0 ||  || MBA-M || 17.6 || 1.3 km || multiple || 2003–2021 || 06 Jan 2021 || 99 || align=left | Disc.: SDSSAlt.: 2015 HY170 || 
|- id="2003 UB406" bgcolor=#fefefe
| 0 ||  || MBA-I || 18.1 || data-sort-value="0.71" | 710 m || multiple || 2003–2021 || 15 Jan 2021 || 91 || align=left | Disc.: Spacewatch || 
|- id="2003 UC406" bgcolor=#d6d6d6
| 0 ||  || MBA-O || 16.7 || 2.5 km || multiple || 2003–2021 || 17 Jan 2021 || 88 || align=left | Disc.: SDSSAlt.: 2003 UG418, 2014 VV29 || 
|- id="2003 UK406" bgcolor=#fefefe
| 0 ||  || MBA-I || 18.91 || data-sort-value="0.49" | 490 m || multiple || 2003–2021 || 10 Jul 2021 || 30 || align=left | Disc.: SDSSAlt.: 2014 ST204 || 
|- id="2003 UM406" bgcolor=#d6d6d6
| 0 ||  || MBA-O || 16.3 || 3.1 km || multiple || 2003–2021 || 05 Jan 2021 || 145 || align=left | Disc.: SDSSAlt.: 2010 BN115, 2014 QH361, 2015 XS120 || 
|- id="2003 UQ406" bgcolor=#fefefe
| 0 ||  || MBA-I || 18.49 || data-sort-value="0.60" | 600 m || multiple || 2003–2021 || 11 May 2021 || 78 || align=left | Disc.: SDSSAlt.: 2015 FS335 || 
|- id="2003 UX406" bgcolor=#E9E9E9
| 1 ||  || MBA-M || 18.01 || 1.4 km || multiple || 2003–2021 || 10 Nov 2021 || 52 || align=left | Disc.: SDSS || 
|- id="2003 UB407" bgcolor=#fefefe
| 2 ||  || MBA-I || 18.9 || data-sort-value="0.49" | 490 m || multiple || 2003–2020 || 18 Oct 2020 || 51 || align=left | Disc.: SDSS || 
|- id="2003 UC407" bgcolor=#E9E9E9
| 3 ||  || MBA-M || 18.2 || data-sort-value="0.96" | 960 m || multiple || 2003–2021 || 29 Nov 2021 || 33 || align=left | Disc.: SDSSAdded on 29 January 2022 || 
|- id="2003 UE407" bgcolor=#d6d6d6
| 0 ||  || MBA-O || 17.2 || 2.0 km || multiple || 2003–2020 || 17 Nov 2020 || 75 || align=left | Disc.: SDSSAdded on 17 January 2021Alt.: 2010 CB53, 2011 FD37 || 
|- id="2003 UF407" bgcolor=#fefefe
| 1 ||  || MBA-I || 19.1 || data-sort-value="0.45" | 450 m || multiple || 2003–2020 || 21 Sep 2020 || 47 || align=left | Disc.: SDSSAdded on 19 October 2020 || 
|- id="2003 UM407" bgcolor=#E9E9E9
| 0 ||  || MBA-M || 17.5 || data-sort-value="0.94" | 940 m || multiple || 2002–2019 || 28 Oct 2019 || 88 || align=left | Disc.: SDSS || 
|- id="2003 UQ407" bgcolor=#d6d6d6
| 0 ||  || MBA-O || 17.4 || 1.8 km || multiple || 2003–2019 || 24 Oct 2019 || 25 || align=left | Disc.: SDSSAdded on 22 July 2020 || 
|- id="2003 US407" bgcolor=#E9E9E9
| 0 ||  || MBA-M || 17.67 || 1.6 km || multiple || 2003–2021 || 09 Nov 2021 || 57 || align=left | Disc.: SDSS || 
|- id="2003 UV407" bgcolor=#d6d6d6
| 0 ||  || MBA-O || 16.8 || 2.4 km || multiple || 2003–2020 || 11 Dec 2020 || 96 || align=left | Disc.: SDSSAlt.: 2014 WG386 || 
|- id="2003 UW407" bgcolor=#d6d6d6
| 0 ||  || MBA-O || 16.6 || 2.7 km || multiple || 2003–2020 || 24 Oct 2020 || 79 || align=left | Disc.: SDSSAlt.: 2006 EG72 || 
|- id="2003 UA408" bgcolor=#d6d6d6
| 2 ||  || MBA-O || 18.0 || 1.4 km || multiple || 2003–2018 || 11 Aug 2018 || 32 || align=left | Disc.: SDSS || 
|- id="2003 UB408" bgcolor=#fefefe
| 0 ||  || MBA-I || 18.0 || data-sort-value="0.75" | 750 m || multiple || 2003–2020 || 24 Jun 2020 || 82 || align=left | Disc.: SDSSAlt.: 2017 QF60 || 
|- id="2003 UC408" bgcolor=#E9E9E9
| 0 ||  || MBA-M || 17.7 || 1.2 km || multiple || 2003–2020 || 14 Sep 2020 || 45 || align=left | Disc.: SDSSAdded on 19 October 2020 || 
|- id="2003 UJ408" bgcolor=#d6d6d6
| 0 ||  || MBA-O || 16.6 || 2.7 km || multiple || 2003–2020 || 17 Oct 2020 || 64 || align=left | Disc.: SDSSAlt.: 2011 CN5, 2015 XL119 || 
|- id="2003 UK408" bgcolor=#E9E9E9
| 0 ||  || MBA-M || 17.29 || 1.9 km || multiple || 2003–2021 || 26 Nov 2021 || 144 || align=left | Disc.: SDSSAlt.: 2007 OY8 || 
|- id="2003 UM408" bgcolor=#E9E9E9
| 0 ||  || MBA-M || 17.33 || 1.9 km || multiple || 2003–2021 || 06 Nov 2021 || 158 || align=left | Disc.: SDSSAlt.: 2006 DD220 || 
|- id="2003 UN408" bgcolor=#d6d6d6
| 0 ||  || MBA-O || 16.35 || 3.0 km || multiple || 2003–2021 || 01 Nov 2021 || 73 || align=left | Disc.: SDSS || 
|- id="2003 UO408" bgcolor=#E9E9E9
| 1 ||  || MBA-M || 18.85 || data-sort-value="0.95" | 950 m || multiple || 2003–2021 || 30 Nov 2021 || 77 || align=left | Disc.: SDSSAdded on 5 November 2021Alt.: 2012 UK237 || 
|- id="2003 UP408" bgcolor=#d6d6d6
| 2 ||  || MBA-O || 17.6 || 1.7 km || multiple || 2003–2020 || 16 Nov 2020 || 29 || align=left | Disc.: SDSSAdded on 17 January 2021Alt.: 2014 SY184 || 
|- id="2003 UQ408" bgcolor=#E9E9E9
| 0 ||  || MBA-M || 17.4 || 1.4 km || multiple || 2003–2020 || 08 Nov 2020 || 129 || align=left | Disc.: SDSS || 
|- id="2003 US408" bgcolor=#fefefe
| 0 ||  || MBA-I || 18.6 || data-sort-value="0.57" | 570 m || multiple || 2003–2020 || 19 Aug 2020 || 51 || align=left | Disc.: SDSSAlt.: 2015 BT245 || 
|- id="2003 UU408" bgcolor=#d6d6d6
| 0 ||  || MBA-O || 16.5 || 2.8 km || multiple || 2003–2020 || 15 Dec 2020 || 85 || align=left | Disc.: SDSS || 
|- id="2003 UW408" bgcolor=#fefefe
| 0 ||  || MBA-I || 17.4 || data-sort-value="0.98" | 980 m || multiple || 2001–2021 || 10 Jun 2021 || 157 || align=left | Disc.: SDSSAlt.: 2014 OH378, 2017 EY18 || 
|- id="2003 UA409" bgcolor=#d6d6d6
| 0 ||  || MBA-O || 17.10 || 2.1 km || multiple || 2003–2021 || 07 Jul 2021 || 69 || align=left | Disc.: SDSSAlt.: 2015 CT17 || 
|- id="2003 UB409" bgcolor=#d6d6d6
| 0 ||  || MBA-O || 16.48 || 2.8 km || multiple || 2003–2021 || 11 Apr 2021 || 144 || align=left | Disc.: SDSSAlt.: 2014 YV48 || 
|- id="2003 UC409" bgcolor=#E9E9E9
| 2 ||  || MBA-M || 18.3 || data-sort-value="0.65" | 650 m || multiple || 2003–2019 || 29 Oct 2019 || 27 || align=left | Disc.: SDSSAdded on 22 July 2020 || 
|- id="2003 UD409" bgcolor=#d6d6d6
| 0 ||  || MBA-O || 17.3 || 1.9 km || multiple || 2003–2021 || 07 Feb 2021 || 23 || align=left | Disc.: SDSSAdded on 21 August 2021 || 
|- id="2003 UG409" bgcolor=#E9E9E9
| 0 ||  || MBA-M || 17.8 || 1.2 km || multiple || 2003–2021 || 06 Jan 2021 || 71 || align=left | Disc.: SDSSAdded on 17 January 2021 || 
|- id="2003 UJ409" bgcolor=#d6d6d6
| 2 ||  || MBA-O || 17.3 || 1.9 km || multiple || 2003–2018 || 18 Aug 2018 || 15 || align=left | Disc.: SDSSAdded on 21 August 2021 || 
|- id="2003 UM409" bgcolor=#E9E9E9
| 0 ||  || MBA-M || 17.1 || 1.6 km || multiple || 2003–2020 || 17 Nov 2020 || 77 || align=left | Disc.: SDSSAlt.: 2016 WE36 || 
|- id="2003 UN409" bgcolor=#d6d6d6
| 0 ||  || MBA-O || 17.30 || 1.9 km || multiple || 2003–2021 || 13 Apr 2021 || 33 || align=left | Disc.: SDSSAdded on 17 June 2021Alt.: 2019 TN33 || 
|- id="2003 UT409" bgcolor=#d6d6d6
| 0 ||  || MBA-O || 17.1 || 2.1 km || multiple || 2003–2021 || 09 Jan 2021 || 40 || align=left | Disc.: SDSSAdded on 22 July 2020 || 
|- id="2003 UW409" bgcolor=#d6d6d6
| 0 ||  || MBA-O || 16.9 || 2.3 km || multiple || 2003–2019 || 29 Nov 2019 || 67 || align=left | Disc.: SDSS || 
|- id="2003 UX409" bgcolor=#d6d6d6
| 0 ||  || MBA-O || 17.84 || 1.5 km || multiple || 2003–2021 || 11 Feb 2021 || 34 || align=left | Disc.: SDSSAdded on 21 August 2021 || 
|- id="2003 UA410" bgcolor=#fefefe
| 0 ||  || MBA-I || 18.40 || data-sort-value="0.62" | 620 m || multiple || 2003–2021 || 30 May 2021 || 49 || align=left | Disc.: SDSSAdded on 22 July 2020Alt.: 2011 WB63 || 
|- id="2003 UD410" bgcolor=#E9E9E9
| 0 ||  || MBA-M || 17.8 || 1.5 km || multiple || 2003–2021 || 27 Nov 2021 || 43 || align=left | Disc.: SDSSAdded on 29 January 2022 || 
|- id="2003 UF410" bgcolor=#E9E9E9
| 3 ||  || MBA-M || 19.3 || data-sort-value="0.58" | 580 m || multiple || 2003–2020 || 16 Nov 2020 || 20 || align=left | Disc.: SDSSAdded on 17 June 2021Alt.: 2020 TY68 || 
|- id="2003 UG410" bgcolor=#fefefe
| 2 ||  || MBA-I || 19.0 || data-sort-value="0.47" | 470 m || multiple || 2003–2019 || 26 Nov 2019 || 49 || align=left | Disc.: SDSS || 
|- id="2003 UH410" bgcolor=#d6d6d6
| 0 ||  || MBA-O || 16.7 || 2.5 km || multiple || 2003–2020 || 17 Oct 2020 || 51 || align=left | Disc.: SDSSAdded on 11 May 2021 || 
|- id="2003 UJ410" bgcolor=#d6d6d6
| 0 ||  || MBA-O || 16.8 || 2.4 km || multiple || 2003–2021 || 15 Jan 2021 || 37 || align=left | Disc.: SDSSAdded on 22 July 2020 || 
|- id="2003 UK410" bgcolor=#d6d6d6
| 0 ||  || MBA-O || 16.4 || 2.9 km || multiple || 2003–2020 || 14 Dec 2020 || 78 || align=left | Disc.: SDSS || 
|- id="2003 UM410" bgcolor=#E9E9E9
| 0 ||  || MBA-M || 17.7 || 1.2 km || multiple || 2003–2020 || 16 Oct 2020 || 54 || align=left | Disc.: SDSS || 
|- id="2003 UO410" bgcolor=#fefefe
| 0 ||  || MBA-I || 18.30 || data-sort-value="0.65" | 650 m || multiple || 2003–2021 || 25 Nov 2021 || 73 || align=left | Disc.: SDSSAdded on 5 November 2021Alt.: 2010 LG150, 2010 RY139 || 
|- id="2003 UW410" bgcolor=#E9E9E9
| 0 ||  || MBA-M || 17.53 || 1.7 km || multiple || 2003–2021 || 06 Nov 2021 || 91 || align=left | Disc.: SDSSAdded on 19 October 2020 || 
|- id="2003 UY410" bgcolor=#E9E9E9
| 0 ||  || MBA-M || 17.48 || 1.8 km || multiple || 2003–2021 || 03 Aug 2021 || 77 || align=left | Disc.: SDSSAdded on 17 January 2021Alt.: 2003 UY446, 2017 VP2 || 
|- id="2003 UA411" bgcolor=#d6d6d6
| 0 ||  || MBA-O || 16.9 || 2.3 km || multiple || 2003–2020 || 22 Apr 2020 || 50 || align=left | Disc.: SDSSAdded on 22 July 2020Alt.: 2015 DK126 || 
|- id="2003 UC411" bgcolor=#E9E9E9
| 0 ||  || MBA-M || 18.18 || 1.3 km || multiple || 2003–2021 || 27 Nov 2021 || 48 || align=left | Disc.: SDSSAdded on 5 November 2021 || 
|- id="2003 UD411" bgcolor=#d6d6d6
| 0 ||  || MBA-O || 16.73 || 2.5 km || multiple || 2003–2022 || 27 Jan 2022 || 90 || align=left | Disc.: SDSS || 
|- id="2003 UJ411" bgcolor=#d6d6d6
| 0 ||  || MBA-O || 17.5 || 1.8 km || multiple || 2003–2020 || 09 Oct 2020 || 28 || align=left | Disc.: SDSSAdded on 17 January 2021 || 
|- id="2003 UK411" bgcolor=#d6d6d6
| 0 ||  || MBA-O || 16.3 || 3.1 km || multiple || 2003–2021 || 14 Jan 2021 || 142 || align=left | Disc.: SDSS || 
|- id="2003 UL411" bgcolor=#d6d6d6
| 0 ||  || MBA-O || 16.64 || 2.6 km || multiple || 2003–2022 || 25 Jan 2022 || 102 || align=left | Disc.: SDSSAlt.: 2011 BG38, 2014 SN194, 2017 FR133 || 
|- id="2003 UM411" bgcolor=#E9E9E9
| 0 ||  || MBA-M || 19.1 || data-sort-value="0.64" | 640 m || multiple || 2003–2020 || 13 Aug 2020 || 18 || align=left | Disc.: SDSSAdded on 21 August 2021Alt.: 2013 AW43 || 
|- id="2003 UU411" bgcolor=#d6d6d6
| 0 ||  || MBA-O || 16.9 || 2.3 km || multiple || 2003–2020 || 25 Mar 2020 || 47 || align=left | Disc.: SDSSAdded on 22 July 2020 || 
|- id="2003 UX411" bgcolor=#d6d6d6
| 0 ||  || MBA-O || 16.4 || 2.9 km || multiple || 2003–2021 || 04 Jan 2021 || 69 || align=left | Disc.: SDSSAdded on 17 January 2021 || 
|- id="2003 UY411" bgcolor=#d6d6d6
| 0 ||  || MBA-O || 16.4 || 2.9 km || multiple || 2003–2019 || 31 Oct 2019 || 100 || align=left | Disc.: SDSSAlt.: 2014 WX345 || 
|- id="2003 UC412" bgcolor=#d6d6d6
| 0 ||  || MBA-O || 16.5 || 2.8 km || multiple || 1995–2020 || 21 Apr 2020 || 98 || align=left | Disc.: SDSSAlt.: 2006 KH84, 2015 FU291 || 
|- id="2003 UE412" bgcolor=#E9E9E9
| 0 ||  || MBA-M || 17.6 || 1.3 km || multiple || 2003–2021 || 13 Feb 2021 || 57 || align=left | Disc.: SDSSAdded on 9 March 2021Alt.: 2009 DW54, 2013 BR65 || 
|- id="2003 UF412" bgcolor=#E9E9E9
| 0 ||  || MBA-M || 17.51 || 1.8 km || multiple || 2003–2021 || 28 Oct 2021 || 81 || align=left | Disc.: SDSS || 
|- id="2003 UG412" bgcolor=#E9E9E9
| 1 ||  || MBA-M || 18.4 || data-sort-value="0.88" | 880 m || multiple || 2003–2020 || 20 Dec 2020 || 31 || align=left | Disc.: SDSSAdded on 9 March 2021 || 
|- id="2003 UN412" bgcolor=#E9E9E9
| 0 ||  || MBA-M || 17.40 || data-sort-value="0.98" | 980 m || multiple || 2003–2021 || 30 Apr 2021 || 298 || align=left | Disc.: SDSS || 
|- id="2003 UR412" bgcolor=#d6d6d6
| 0 ||  || MBA-O || 16.4 || 2.9 km || multiple || 2003–2021 || 15 Jan 2021 || 78 || align=left | Disc.: SDSS || 
|- id="2003 UM413" bgcolor=#E9E9E9
| 1 ||  || MBA-M || 19.1 || data-sort-value="0.45" | 450 m || multiple || 2003–2021 || 17 Feb 2021 || 24 || align=left | Disc.: Kitt Peak Obs.Added on 5 November 2021 || 
|- id="2003 UR413" bgcolor=#fefefe
| 0 ||  || MBA-I || 18.2 || data-sort-value="0.68" | 680 m || multiple || 2003–2018 || 17 Nov 2018 || 33 || align=left | Disc.: Kitt Peak Obs.Alt.: 2014 SC258 || 
|- id="2003 UV413" bgcolor=#d6d6d6
| 0 ||  || MBA-O || 17.3 || 1.9 km || multiple || 2003–2020 || 14 Dec 2020 || 43 || align=left | Disc.: Kitt Peak Obs.Added on 22 July 2020 || 
|- id="2003 UA414" bgcolor=#C2E0FF
| 2 ||  || TNO || 5.03 || 357 km || multiple || 2003–2021 || 25 Nov 2021 || 145 || align=left | Disc.: NEATLoUTNOs, res2:9 || 
|- id="2003 UC414" bgcolor=#C2E0FF
| E ||  || TNO || 8.3 || 122 km || single || 58 days || 27 Dec 2003 || 19 || align=left | Disc.: Cerro Tololo Obs.LoUTNOs, centaur || 
|- id="2003 UT414" bgcolor=#E9E9E9
| 0 ||  || MBA-M || 17.57 || data-sort-value="0.91" | 910 m || multiple || 1995–2021 || 09 Apr 2021 || 122 || align=left | Disc.: LINEARAlt.: 2015 RE121 || 
|- id="2003 UX414" bgcolor=#d6d6d6
| 0 ||  || HIL || 16.3 || 3.1 km || multiple || 2003–2021 || 18 Jan 2021 || 60 || align=left | Disc.: SDSSAlt.: 2011 VU2 || 
|- id="2003 UF415" bgcolor=#fefefe
| 2 ||  || MBA-I || 18.9 || data-sort-value="0.49" | 490 m || multiple || 2003–2020 || 16 Sep 2020 || 57 || align=left | Disc.: Tenagra II Obs. || 
|- id="2003 UJ415" bgcolor=#fefefe
| 1 ||  || MBA-I || 18.4 || data-sort-value="0.62" | 620 m || multiple || 2003–2016 || 30 Nov 2016 || 54 || align=left | Disc.: Spacewatch || 
|- id="2003 UA416" bgcolor=#d6d6d6
| 0 ||  || MBA-O || 16.6 || 2.7 km || multiple || 2001–2021 || 18 Jan 2021 || 89 || align=left | Disc.: Spacewatch IIAlt.: 2006 HZ77 || 
|- id="2003 UD416" bgcolor=#fefefe
| 0 ||  || MBA-I || 18.7 || data-sort-value="0.54" | 540 m || multiple || 2003–2021 || 08 Nov 2021 || 68 || align=left | Disc.: SpacewatchAdded on 29 January 2022 || 
|- id="2003 UN416" bgcolor=#d6d6d6
| 0 ||  || MBA-O || 16.9 || 2.3 km || multiple || 2003–2020 || 10 Dec 2020 || 84 || align=left | Disc.: SDSSAlt.: 2009 WX266, 2014 TB58 || 
|- id="2003 UO416" bgcolor=#d6d6d6
| 0 ||  || MBA-O || 17.3 || 1.9 km || multiple || 2003–2021 || 18 Jan 2021 || 50 || align=left | Disc.: SDSS || 
|- id="2003 UP416" bgcolor=#d6d6d6
| 0 ||  || MBA-O || 16.8 || 2.4 km || multiple || 2003–2019 || 22 Oct 2019 || 70 || align=left | Disc.: SDSSAlt.: 2011 CN71 || 
|- id="2003 UQ416" bgcolor=#E9E9E9
| – ||  || MBA-M || 19.6 || data-sort-value="0.36" | 360 m || single || 5 days || 24 Oct 2003 || 6 || align=left | Disc.: SDSS || 
|- id="2003 UX416" bgcolor=#E9E9E9
| 0 ||  || MBA-M || 17.74 || 1.6 km || multiple || 2003–2021 || 28 Sep 2021 || 61 || align=left | Disc.: SDSSAdded on 30 September 2021 || 
|- id="2003 UN417" bgcolor=#E9E9E9
| 0 ||  || MBA-M || 18.25 || data-sort-value="0.94" | 940 m || multiple || 2003–2021 || 09 Dec 2021 || 26 || align=left | Disc.: SpacewatchAdded on 21 August 2021 || 
|- id="2003 UP417" bgcolor=#d6d6d6
| 1 ||  || MBA-O || 17.5 || 1.8 km || multiple || 2003–2020 || 16 Nov 2020 || 33 || align=left | Disc.: SDSSAdded on 17 January 2021Alt.: 2014 SL78 || 
|- id="2003 UC418" bgcolor=#fefefe
| 0 ||  || MBA-I || 19.15 || data-sort-value="0.44" | 440 m || multiple || 2003–2021 || 07 Apr 2021 || 63 || align=left | Disc.: SDSSAlt.: 2003 UU379, 2016 WX10 || 
|- id="2003 UL418" bgcolor=#fefefe
| 0 ||  || MBA-I || 17.9 || data-sort-value="0.78" | 780 m || multiple || 2003–2020 || 17 Nov 2020 || 95 || align=left | Disc.: SDSS || 
|- id="2003 UR418" bgcolor=#fefefe
| 0 ||  || MBA-I || 18.00 || data-sort-value="0.75" | 750 m || multiple || 1994–2022 || 06 Jan 2022 || 112 || align=left | Disc.: SDSS || 
|- id="2003 UT418" bgcolor=#E9E9E9
| 1 ||  || MBA-M || 18.3 || data-sort-value="0.65" | 650 m || multiple || 2003–2021 || 16 Jan 2021 || 61 || align=left | Disc.: LINEARAlt.: 2007 RZ135 || 
|- id="2003 UZ418" bgcolor=#d6d6d6
| 2 ||  || MBA-O || 17.4 || 1.8 km || multiple || 2003–2020 || 23 Jan 2020 || 44 || align=left | Disc.: LPL/Spacewatch IIAdded on 24 December 2021 || 
|- id="2003 UA419" bgcolor=#d6d6d6
| 0 ||  || MBA-O || 17.17 || 2.0 km || multiple || 1998–2021 || 11 May 2021 || 99 || align=left | Disc.: SpacewatchAlt.: 2015 AA117 || 
|- id="2003 UC419" bgcolor=#d6d6d6
| 0 ||  || MBA-O || 17.3 || 1.9 km || multiple || 2003–2021 || 06 Jan 2021 || 48 || align=left | Disc.: SDSSAlt.: 2014 WO150 || 
|- id="2003 UG419" bgcolor=#E9E9E9
| 0 ||  || MBA-M || 17.01 || 1.7 km || multiple || 1996–2022 || 25 Jan 2022 || 164 || align=left | Disc.: NEAT || 
|- id="2003 UH419" bgcolor=#fefefe
| 0 ||  || HUN || 18.4 || data-sort-value="0.62" | 620 m || multiple || 2003–2021 || 16 Jan 2021 || 105 || align=left | Disc.: NEAT || 
|- id="2003 UJ419" bgcolor=#FA8072
| 0 ||  || MCA || 18.8 || data-sort-value="0.73" | 730 m || multiple || 1999–2021 || 09 Jan 2021 || 89 || align=left | Disc.: LONEOS || 
|- id="2003 UK419" bgcolor=#fefefe
| 0 ||  || MBA-I || 18.08 || data-sort-value="0.72" | 720 m || multiple || 1992–2021 || 03 Aug 2021 || 54 || align=left | Disc.: NEAT || 
|- id="2003 UL419" bgcolor=#fefefe
| 0 ||  || MBA-I || 18.5 || data-sort-value="0.59" | 590 m || multiple || 1996–2021 || 18 Jan 2021 || 58 || align=left | Disc.: Spacewatch || 
|- id="2003 UT419" bgcolor=#fefefe
| 0 ||  || MBA-I || 17.79 || data-sort-value="0.82" | 820 m || multiple || 2003–2021 || 27 Sep 2021 || 133 || align=left | Disc.: Kitt Peak Obs. || 
|- id="2003 UU419" bgcolor=#fefefe
| 0 ||  || MBA-I || 18.0 || data-sort-value="0.75" | 750 m || multiple || 2003–2020 || 10 Sep 2020 || 102 || align=left | Disc.: Spacewatch II || 
|- id="2003 UA420" bgcolor=#d6d6d6
| 0 ||  || MBA-O || 16.7 || 2.5 km || multiple || 2003–2018 || 07 Nov 2018 || 89 || align=left | Disc.: SDSSAlt.: 2008 UP399 || 
|- id="2003 UD420" bgcolor=#d6d6d6
| 0 ||  || MBA-O || 16.7 || 2.5 km || multiple || 2003–2021 || 06 Jun 2021 || 121 || align=left | Disc.: Spacewatch || 
|- id="2003 UH420" bgcolor=#d6d6d6
| 0 ||  || MBA-O || 16.78 || 2.5 km || multiple || 2003–2022 || 12 Jan 2022 || 80 || align=left | Disc.: SDSS || 
|- id="2003 UJ420" bgcolor=#fefefe
| 0 ||  || MBA-I || 18.64 || data-sort-value="0.56" | 560 m || multiple || 2003–2021 || 30 Sep 2021 || 104 || align=left | Disc.: Spacewatch || 
|- id="2003 UK420" bgcolor=#E9E9E9
| 0 ||  || MBA-M || 17.1 || 1.6 km || multiple || 2003–2020 || 17 Nov 2020 || 119 || align=left | Disc.: Spacewatch || 
|- id="2003 UL420" bgcolor=#d6d6d6
| 0 ||  || MBA-O || 16.0 || 3.5 km || multiple || 2003–2021 || 12 Jun 2021 || 130 || align=left | Disc.: Spacewatch || 
|- id="2003 UM420" bgcolor=#E9E9E9
| 0 ||  || MBA-M || 17.20 || 2.0 km || multiple || 2003–2021 || 30 Oct 2021 || 142 || align=left | Disc.: Spacewatch || 
|- id="2003 UQ420" bgcolor=#d6d6d6
| 0 ||  || MBA-O || 16.91 || 2.3 km || multiple || 2003–2021 || 03 Apr 2021 || 78 || align=left | Disc.: Spacewatch || 
|- id="2003 UR420" bgcolor=#fefefe
| 0 ||  || MBA-I || 18.42 || data-sort-value="0.62" | 620 m || multiple || 2003–2021 || 14 Aug 2021 || 81 || align=left | Disc.: Spacewatch || 
|- id="2003 UW420" bgcolor=#d6d6d6
| 0 ||  || MBA-O || 16.1 || 3.4 km || multiple || 2003–2021 || 17 Jan 2021 || 119 || align=left | Disc.: Spacewatch || 
|- id="2003 UZ420" bgcolor=#fefefe
| 0 ||  || MBA-I || 18.3 || data-sort-value="0.65" | 650 m || multiple || 2003–2018 || 20 Jan 2018 || 72 || align=left | Disc.: Spacewatch II || 
|- id="2003 UB421" bgcolor=#E9E9E9
| 0 ||  || MBA-M || 17.54 || 1.7 km || multiple || 2003–2021 || 03 Oct 2021 || 66 || align=left | Disc.: Spacewatch II || 
|- id="2003 UD421" bgcolor=#fefefe
| 0 ||  || MBA-I || 18.3 || data-sort-value="0.65" | 650 m || multiple || 2003–2019 || 03 Jul 2019 || 76 || align=left | Disc.: Spacewatch || 
|- id="2003 UE421" bgcolor=#fefefe
| 0 ||  || MBA-I || 18.23 || data-sort-value="0.67" | 670 m || multiple || 1996–2021 || 25 Nov 2021 || 134 || align=left | Disc.: SpacewatchAlt.: 1996 TO29 || 
|- id="2003 UF421" bgcolor=#E9E9E9
| 0 ||  || MBA-M || 16.23 || 3.2 km || multiple || 2003–2021 || 31 Oct 2021 || 158 || align=left | Disc.: Spacewatch || 
|- id="2003 UH421" bgcolor=#E9E9E9
| 0 ||  || MBA-M || 16.8 || 1.3 km || multiple || 1991–2021 || 17 Jan 2021 || 126 || align=left | Disc.: SpacewatchAlt.: 2010 HG72, 2017 DD129 || 
|- id="2003 UJ421" bgcolor=#d6d6d6
| 0 ||  || MBA-O || 17.2 || 2.0 km || multiple || 2003–2020 || 23 Mar 2020 || 82 || align=left | Disc.: Spacewatch II || 
|- id="2003 UL421" bgcolor=#E9E9E9
| 0 ||  || MBA-M || 17.50 || 1.3 km || multiple || 2003–2022 || 10 Jan 2022 || 79 || align=left | Disc.: Spacewatch || 
|- id="2003 UN421" bgcolor=#fefefe
| 0 ||  || MBA-I || 18.2 || data-sort-value="0.68" | 680 m || multiple || 1996–2021 || 12 Jan 2021 || 118 || align=left | Disc.: Spacewatch || 
|- id="2003 UQ421" bgcolor=#fefefe
| 0 ||  || MBA-I || 17.33 || 1.0 km || multiple || 2003–2021 || 31 Oct 2021 || 216 || align=left | Disc.: SpacewatchAlt.: 2016 CN14 || 
|- id="2003 UR421" bgcolor=#E9E9E9
| 0 ||  || MBA-M || 17.34 || 1.9 km || multiple || 2003–2021 || 03 Oct 2021 || 114 || align=left | Disc.: Spacewatch || 
|- id="2003 UU421" bgcolor=#d6d6d6
| 0 ||  || MBA-O || 16.47 || 2.8 km || multiple || 2003–2022 || 25 Jan 2022 || 111 || align=left | Disc.: SpacewatchAlt.: 2010 DY12 || 
|- id="2003 UW421" bgcolor=#fefefe
| 0 ||  || MBA-I || 17.6 || data-sort-value="0.90" | 900 m || multiple || 2003–2021 || 24 Jan 2021 || 80 || align=left | Disc.: Kitt Peak Obs. || 
|- id="2003 UX421" bgcolor=#fefefe
| 0 ||  || MBA-I || 18.68 || data-sort-value="0.55" | 550 m || multiple || 2003–2021 || 19 Feb 2021 || 107 || align=left | Disc.: Spacewatch || 
|- id="2003 UY421" bgcolor=#fefefe
| 0 ||  || MBA-I || 17.8 || data-sort-value="0.82" | 820 m || multiple || 2003–2021 || 11 Jun 2021 || 106 || align=left | Disc.: NEAT || 
|- id="2003 UZ421" bgcolor=#E9E9E9
| 0 ||  || MBA-M || 17.36 || 1.4 km || multiple || 2003–2022 || 20 Jan 2022 || 78 || align=left | Disc.: SDSS || 
|- id="2003 UA422" bgcolor=#E9E9E9
| 0 ||  || MBA-M || 17.7 || data-sort-value="0.86" | 860 m || multiple || 2003–2020 || 23 Dec 2020 || 70 || align=left | Disc.: Spacewatch || 
|- id="2003 UC422" bgcolor=#fefefe
| 0 ||  || MBA-I || 18.16 || data-sort-value="0.69" | 690 m || multiple || 2003–2022 || 25 Jan 2022 || 121 || align=left | Disc.: Spacewatch || 
|- id="2003 UD422" bgcolor=#fefefe
| 0 ||  || MBA-I || 18.19 || data-sort-value="0.68" | 680 m || multiple || 2003–2021 || 14 May 2021 || 67 || align=left | Disc.: Spacewatch || 
|- id="2003 UE422" bgcolor=#E9E9E9
| 0 ||  || MBA-M || 17.5 || 1.3 km || multiple || 2003–2020 || 06 Dec 2020 || 76 || align=left | Disc.: Spacewatch II || 
|- id="2003 UL422" bgcolor=#fefefe
| 0 ||  || MBA-I || 18.1 || data-sort-value="0.71" | 710 m || multiple || 2003–2021 || 15 Jan 2021 || 132 || align=left | Disc.: Spacewatch || 
|- id="2003 UM422" bgcolor=#d6d6d6
| 0 ||  || MBA-O || 16.29 || 3.1 km || multiple || 2003–2022 || 07 Jan 2022 || 132 || align=left | Disc.: SDSSAlt.: 2010 CU223 || 
|- id="2003 UP422" bgcolor=#E9E9E9
| 0 ||  || MBA-M || 17.35 || 1.9 km || multiple || 2003–2021 || 09 Jul 2021 || 71 || align=left | Disc.: Spacewatch || 
|- id="2003 UR422" bgcolor=#E9E9E9
| 0 ||  || MBA-M || 17.36 || 1.9 km || multiple || 2003–2021 || 08 Sep 2021 || 78 || align=left | Disc.: Spacewatch || 
|- id="2003 US422" bgcolor=#fefefe
| 0 ||  || MBA-I || 18.1 || data-sort-value="0.71" | 710 m || multiple || 2003–2021 || 15 Jan 2021 || 99 || align=left | Disc.: SpacewatchAlt.: 2011 BR8 || 
|- id="2003 UV422" bgcolor=#d6d6d6
| 0 ||  || MBA-O || 16.5 || 2.8 km || multiple || 2003–2021 || 11 Jan 2021 || 105 || align=left | Disc.: Spacewatch || 
|- id="2003 UX422" bgcolor=#fefefe
| 0 ||  || MBA-I || 18.3 || data-sort-value="0.65" | 650 m || multiple || 2003–2020 || 24 Dec 2020 || 65 || align=left | Disc.: Spacewatch || 
|- id="2003 UY422" bgcolor=#fefefe
| 0 ||  || MBA-I || 18.7 || data-sort-value="0.54" | 540 m || multiple || 2003–2019 || 24 Aug 2019 || 70 || align=left | Disc.: SDSS || 
|- id="2003 UA423" bgcolor=#fefefe
| 0 ||  || MBA-I || 18.2 || data-sort-value="0.68" | 680 m || multiple || 2003–2020 || 09 Dec 2020 || 91 || align=left | Disc.: Spacewatch || 
|- id="2003 UC423" bgcolor=#fefefe
| 0 ||  || MBA-I || 17.7 || data-sort-value="0.86" | 860 m || multiple || 2003–2020 || 16 Nov 2020 || 86 || align=left | Disc.: Spacewatch II || 
|- id="2003 UE423" bgcolor=#E9E9E9
| 0 ||  || MBA-M || 17.3 || 1.0 km || multiple || 2003–2020 || 20 Dec 2020 || 88 || align=left | Disc.: Spacewatch || 
|- id="2003 UK423" bgcolor=#E9E9E9
| 0 ||  || MBA-M || 17.1 || 1.6 km || multiple || 2003–2021 || 05 Jan 2021 || 91 || align=left | Disc.: Spacewatch || 
|- id="2003 UM423" bgcolor=#d6d6d6
| 0 ||  || MBA-O || 16.6 || 2.7 km || multiple || 2003–2020 || 22 Dec 2020 || 79 || align=left | Disc.: Spacewatch || 
|- id="2003 UQ423" bgcolor=#d6d6d6
| 0 ||  || MBA-O || 16.2 || 3.2 km || multiple || 2003–2020 || 15 Dec 2020 || 105 || align=left | Disc.: Spacewatch || 
|- id="2003 US423" bgcolor=#d6d6d6
| 0 ||  || MBA-O || 16.81 || 2.4 km || multiple || 2003–2022 || 27 Jan 2022 || 87 || align=left | Disc.: Kitt Peak Obs. || 
|- id="2003 UT423" bgcolor=#fefefe
| 0 ||  || MBA-I || 18.2 || data-sort-value="0.68" | 680 m || multiple || 2003–2021 || 14 Jan 2021 || 88 || align=left | Disc.: Spacewatch || 
|- id="2003 UU423" bgcolor=#fefefe
| 0 ||  || MBA-I || 18.3 || data-sort-value="0.65" | 650 m || multiple || 1996–2020 || 17 Oct 2020 || 121 || align=left | Disc.: Spacewatch || 
|- id="2003 UV423" bgcolor=#fefefe
| 0 ||  || MBA-I || 18.5 || data-sort-value="0.59" | 590 m || multiple || 2003–2019 || 04 Sep 2019 || 66 || align=left | Disc.: Spacewatch II || 
|- id="2003 UW423" bgcolor=#fefefe
| 0 ||  || MBA-I || 18.2 || data-sort-value="0.68" | 680 m || multiple || 2003–2018 || 01 Nov 2018 || 54 || align=left | Disc.: Kitt Peak Obs. || 
|- id="2003 UX423" bgcolor=#fefefe
| 0 ||  || MBA-I || 18.1 || data-sort-value="0.71" | 710 m || multiple || 2003–2020 || 04 Dec 2020 || 72 || align=left | Disc.: Spacewatch II || 
|- id="2003 UY423" bgcolor=#E9E9E9
| 0 ||  || MBA-M || 17.58 || 1.7 km || multiple || 2003–2021 || 08 Sep 2021 || 84 || align=left | Disc.: Spacewatch || 
|- id="2003 UZ423" bgcolor=#d6d6d6
| 0 ||  || MBA-O || 16.3 || 3.1 km || multiple || 2003–2020 || 13 May 2020 || 71 || align=left | Disc.: Spacewatch || 
|- id="2003 UA424" bgcolor=#d6d6d6
| 0 ||  || MBA-O || 16.3 || 3.1 km || multiple || 2003–2021 || 10 Jan 2021 || 90 || align=left | Disc.: SDSSAlt.: 2016 BP54 || 
|- id="2003 UB424" bgcolor=#E9E9E9
| 0 ||  || MBA-M || 17.60 || 1.7 km || multiple || 2003–2021 || 30 Jul 2021 || 69 || align=left | Disc.: Spacewatch || 
|- id="2003 UC424" bgcolor=#d6d6d6
| 0 ||  || MBA-O || 16.7 || 2.5 km || multiple || 2003–2020 || 14 Dec 2020 || 87 || align=left | Disc.: SpacewatchAlt.: 2010 DN97 || 
|- id="2003 UF424" bgcolor=#E9E9E9
| 0 ||  || MBA-M || 17.48 || 1.8 km || multiple || 2003–2021 || 04 Oct 2021 || 71 || align=left | Disc.: Spacewatch || 
|- id="2003 UH424" bgcolor=#d6d6d6
| 0 ||  || MBA-O || 17.4 || 1.8 km || multiple || 2003–2020 || 22 Apr 2020 || 55 || align=left | Disc.: Kitt Peak Obs. || 
|- id="2003 UK424" bgcolor=#E9E9E9
| 0 ||  || MBA-M || 17.59 || 1.7 km || multiple || 2003–2021 || 03 Oct 2021 || 82 || align=left | — || 
|- id="2003 UL424" bgcolor=#d6d6d6
| 0 ||  || MBA-O || 16.77 || 2.5 km || multiple || 2003–2022 || 25 Jan 2022 || 82 || align=left | — || 
|- id="2003 UM424" bgcolor=#E9E9E9
| 0 ||  || MBA-M || 17.90 || 1.5 km || multiple || 2003–2021 || 06 Oct 2021 || 102 || align=left | — || 
|- id="2003 UN424" bgcolor=#d6d6d6
| 0 ||  || MBA-O || 16.63 || 2.6 km || multiple || 2003–2022 || 26 Jan 2022 || 88 || align=left | — || 
|- id="2003 UO424" bgcolor=#E9E9E9
| 0 ||  || MBA-M || 17.60 || 1.7 km || multiple || 2003–2021 || 09 Oct 2021 || 88 || align=left | — || 
|- id="2003 UP424" bgcolor=#fefefe
| 0 ||  || MBA-I || 18.2 || data-sort-value="0.68" | 680 m || multiple || 2003–2019 || 27 Oct 2019 || 130 || align=left | — || 
|- id="2003 US424" bgcolor=#E9E9E9
| 0 ||  || MBA-M || 17.7 || 1.2 km || multiple || 2003–2020 || 21 Oct 2020 || 144 || align=left | — || 
|- id="2003 UU424" bgcolor=#E9E9E9
| 0 ||  || MBA-M || 17.3 || 1.5 km || multiple || 2003–2021 || 07 Jan 2021 || 102 || align=left | — || 
|- id="2003 UW424" bgcolor=#E9E9E9
| 0 ||  || MBA-M || 17.5 || data-sort-value="0.94" | 940 m || multiple || 2003–2021 || 15 Jan 2021 || 104 || align=left | — || 
|- id="2003 UY424" bgcolor=#d6d6d6
| 0 ||  || MBA-O || 16.50 || 2.8 km || multiple || 2003–2022 || 27 Jan 2022 || 119 || align=left | Alt.: 2010 DH20 || 
|- id="2003 UA425" bgcolor=#E9E9E9
| 0 ||  || MBA-M || 17.8 || data-sort-value="0.82" | 820 m || multiple || 2003–2017 || 01 Apr 2017 || 49 || align=left | — || 
|- id="2003 UB425" bgcolor=#fefefe
| 0 ||  || MBA-I || 19.10 || data-sort-value="0.45" | 450 m || multiple || 2003–2021 || 28 Nov 2021 || 57 || align=left | — || 
|- id="2003 UD425" bgcolor=#E9E9E9
| 0 ||  || MBA-M || 17.4 || data-sort-value="0.98" | 980 m || multiple || 2003–2020 || 07 Dec 2020 || 69 || align=left | — || 
|- id="2003 UG425" bgcolor=#fefefe
| 0 ||  || MBA-I || 18.4 || data-sort-value="0.62" | 620 m || multiple || 2003–2019 || 28 Oct 2019 || 101 || align=left | — || 
|- id="2003 UJ425" bgcolor=#E9E9E9
| 0 ||  || MBA-M || 17.82 || 1.5 km || multiple || 1994–2021 || 07 Nov 2021 || 76 || align=left | — || 
|- id="2003 UK425" bgcolor=#E9E9E9
| 0 ||  || MBA-M || 17.42 || 1.4 km || multiple || 2003–2022 || 27 Jan 2022 || 117 || align=left | — || 
|- id="2003 UL425" bgcolor=#fefefe
| 0 ||  || MBA-I || 18.0 || data-sort-value="0.75" | 750 m || multiple || 2003–2020 || 20 Jan 2020 || 47 || align=left | — || 
|- id="2003 UN425" bgcolor=#d6d6d6
| 0 ||  || MBA-O || 17.51 || 1.8 km || multiple || 2003–2021 || 08 May 2021 || 59 || align=left | — || 
|- id="2003 UO425" bgcolor=#d6d6d6
| 0 ||  || MBA-O || 17.1 || 2.1 km || multiple || 2003–2019 || 23 Oct 2019 || 51 || align=left | — || 
|- id="2003 UQ425" bgcolor=#fefefe
| 0 ||  || MBA-I || 18.6 || data-sort-value="0.57" | 570 m || multiple || 2003–2020 || 18 Sep 2020 || 82 || align=left | — || 
|- id="2003 UR425" bgcolor=#fefefe
| 0 ||  || MBA-I || 18.4 || data-sort-value="0.62" | 620 m || multiple || 2003–2019 || 26 Sep 2019 || 55 || align=left | — || 
|- id="2003 US425" bgcolor=#E9E9E9
| 0 ||  || MBA-M || 17.42 || 1.8 km || multiple || 2003–2021 || 01 Oct 2021 || 68 || align=left | — || 
|- id="2003 UU425" bgcolor=#E9E9E9
| 0 ||  || MBA-M || 17.49 || 1.8 km || multiple || 2003–2021 || 27 Nov 2021 || 82 || align=left | — || 
|- id="2003 UW425" bgcolor=#E9E9E9
| 0 ||  || MBA-M || 18.28 || data-sort-value="0.66" | 660 m || multiple || 2003–2021 || 14 Apr 2021 || 112 || align=left | — || 
|- id="2003 UZ425" bgcolor=#fefefe
| 0 ||  || MBA-I || 18.08 || data-sort-value="0.72" | 720 m || multiple || 2003–2021 || 09 May 2021 || 82 || align=left | — || 
|- id="2003 UA426" bgcolor=#E9E9E9
| 0 ||  || MBA-M || 17.8 || data-sort-value="0.82" | 820 m || multiple || 2003–2021 || 24 Jan 2021 || 75 || align=left | — || 
|- id="2003 UB426" bgcolor=#fefefe
| 0 ||  || MBA-I || 18.7 || data-sort-value="0.54" | 540 m || multiple || 2003–2020 || 15 Dec 2020 || 72 || align=left | — || 
|- id="2003 UC426" bgcolor=#fefefe
| 0 ||  || MBA-I || 18.5 || data-sort-value="0.59" | 590 m || multiple || 2003–2021 || 11 Jan 2021 || 127 || align=left | — || 
|- id="2003 UD426" bgcolor=#d6d6d6
| 0 ||  || MBA-O || 16.8 || 2.4 km || multiple || 2003–2020 || 17 Dec 2020 || 66 || align=left | — || 
|- id="2003 UE426" bgcolor=#d6d6d6
| 0 ||  || MBA-O || 16.8 || 2.4 km || multiple || 2003–2020 || 15 Dec 2020 || 87 || align=left | — || 
|- id="2003 UF426" bgcolor=#E9E9E9
| 0 ||  || MBA-M || 17.69 || 1.6 km || multiple || 2003–2021 || 25 Nov 2021 || 73 || align=left | — || 
|- id="2003 UG426" bgcolor=#fefefe
| 0 ||  || MBA-I || 18.2 || data-sort-value="0.68" | 680 m || multiple || 2003–2021 || 09 Jan 2021 || 102 || align=left | — || 
|- id="2003 UJ426" bgcolor=#fefefe
| 0 ||  || MBA-I || 18.4 || data-sort-value="0.62" | 620 m || multiple || 2003–2020 || 23 Jun 2020 || 49 || align=left | — || 
|- id="2003 UK426" bgcolor=#fefefe
| 0 ||  || MBA-I || 18.91 || data-sort-value="0.49" | 490 m || multiple || 2003–2021 || 28 Nov 2021 || 46 || align=left | — || 
|- id="2003 UL426" bgcolor=#fefefe
| 0 ||  || MBA-I || 18.55 || data-sort-value="0.58" | 580 m || multiple || 2003–2021 || 21 Apr 2021 || 90 || align=left | — || 
|- id="2003 UM426" bgcolor=#E9E9E9
| 0 ||  || MBA-M || 18.0 || 1.1 km || multiple || 2003–2020 || 24 Oct 2020 || 75 || align=left | — || 
|- id="2003 UO426" bgcolor=#E9E9E9
| 0 ||  || MBA-M || 17.90 || 1.5 km || multiple || 2003–2021 || 30 Nov 2021 || 66 || align=left | — || 
|- id="2003 UP426" bgcolor=#E9E9E9
| 0 ||  || MBA-M || 17.2 || 1.5 km || multiple || 2003–2021 || 12 Jan 2021 || 82 || align=left | — || 
|- id="2003 UQ426" bgcolor=#d6d6d6
| 0 ||  || MBA-O || 16.6 || 2.7 km || multiple || 2003–2021 || 04 Jan 2021 || 73 || align=left | — || 
|- id="2003 US426" bgcolor=#fefefe
| 1 ||  || MBA-I || 18.5 || data-sort-value="0.59" | 590 m || multiple || 2003–2020 || 21 May 2020 || 65 || align=left | — || 
|- id="2003 UU426" bgcolor=#E9E9E9
| 0 ||  || MBA-M || 17.60 || 1.3 km || multiple || 2003–2021 || 02 Dec 2021 || 76 || align=left | — || 
|- id="2003 UX426" bgcolor=#fefefe
| 0 ||  || MBA-I || 17.5 || data-sort-value="0.94" | 940 m || multiple || 2003–2020 || 15 Oct 2020 || 100 || align=left | — || 
|- id="2003 UY426" bgcolor=#E9E9E9
| 0 ||  || MBA-M || 17.85 || 1.5 km || multiple || 2003–2021 || 30 Nov 2021 || 83 || align=left | — || 
|- id="2003 UA427" bgcolor=#fefefe
| 0 ||  || MBA-I || 18.69 || data-sort-value="0.54" | 540 m || multiple || 2003–2021 || 09 Dec 2021 || 62 || align=left | — || 
|- id="2003 UC427" bgcolor=#fefefe
| 0 ||  || MBA-I || 18.3 || data-sort-value="0.65" | 650 m || multiple || 2003–2020 || 11 Oct 2020 || 65 || align=left | — || 
|- id="2003 UE427" bgcolor=#E9E9E9
| 0 ||  || MBA-M || 17.55 || 1.7 km || multiple || 2003–2021 || 27 Oct 2021 || 69 || align=left | — || 
|- id="2003 UJ427" bgcolor=#E9E9E9
| 0 ||  || MBA-M || 17.53 || 1.7 km || multiple || 2003–2021 || 07 Sep 2021 || 92 || align=left | — || 
|- id="2003 UK427" bgcolor=#E9E9E9
| 0 ||  || MBA-M || 17.16 || 1.6 km || multiple || 2003–2022 || 07 Jan 2022 || 135 || align=left | Alt.: 2010 LV25 || 
|- id="2003 UL427" bgcolor=#d6d6d6
| 0 ||  || MBA-O || 16.8 || 2.4 km || multiple || 2003–2019 || 29 Oct 2019 || 65 || align=left | — || 
|- id="2003 UM427" bgcolor=#d6d6d6
| 0 ||  || MBA-O || 16.5 || 2.8 km || multiple || 2003–2021 || 14 Jan 2021 || 83 || align=left | Alt.: 2010 FQ33 || 
|- id="2003 UN427" bgcolor=#fefefe
| 0 ||  || MBA-I || 18.5 || data-sort-value="0.59" | 590 m || multiple || 2003–2019 || 15 Nov 2019 || 67 || align=left | — || 
|- id="2003 UO427" bgcolor=#d6d6d6
| 0 ||  || MBA-O || 16.3 || 3.1 km || multiple || 2003–2021 || 15 Jan 2021 || 84 || align=left | — || 
|- id="2003 UP427" bgcolor=#fefefe
| 0 ||  || MBA-I || 18.4 || data-sort-value="0.62" | 620 m || multiple || 2003–2020 || 15 Dec 2020 || 102 || align=left | — || 
|- id="2003 UQ427" bgcolor=#E9E9E9
| 0 ||  || MBA-M || 17.74 || 1.6 km || multiple || 2003–2021 || 07 Nov 2021 || 77 || align=left | — || 
|- id="2003 UR427" bgcolor=#E9E9E9
| 0 ||  || MBA-M || 17.25 || 2.0 km || multiple || 2003–2022 || 06 Jan 2022 || 111 || align=left | — || 
|- id="2003 UT427" bgcolor=#fefefe
| 0 ||  || MBA-I || 18.4 || data-sort-value="0.62" | 620 m || multiple || 2003–2020 || 12 Jul 2020 || 53 || align=left | — || 
|- id="2003 UU427" bgcolor=#fefefe
| 3 ||  || MBA-I || 18.7 || data-sort-value="0.54" | 540 m || multiple || 1996–2017 || 26 Nov 2017 || 42 || align=left | — || 
|- id="2003 UW427" bgcolor=#E9E9E9
| 0 ||  || MBA-M || 18.23 || data-sort-value="0.95" | 950 m || multiple || 2003–2022 || 07 Jan 2022 || 42 || align=left | — || 
|- id="2003 UX427" bgcolor=#E9E9E9
| 0 ||  || MBA-M || 17.6 || 1.3 km || multiple || 2003–2020 || 20 Oct 2020 || 40 || align=left | — || 
|- id="2003 UZ427" bgcolor=#d6d6d6
| 0 ||  || MBA-O || 16.5 || 2.8 km || multiple || 2003–2021 || 16 Jan 2021 || 73 || align=left | — || 
|- id="2003 UA428" bgcolor=#d6d6d6
| 0 ||  || MBA-O || 17.1 || 2.1 km || multiple || 2003–2019 || 02 Dec 2019 || 58 || align=left | — || 
|- id="2003 UB428" bgcolor=#E9E9E9
| 0 ||  || MBA-M || 17.94 || 1.1 km || multiple || 1999–2022 || 25 Jan 2022 || 77 || align=left | — || 
|- id="2003 UC428" bgcolor=#fefefe
| 0 ||  || MBA-I || 18.3 || data-sort-value="0.65" | 650 m || multiple || 2003–2021 || 17 Jan 2021 || 43 || align=left | — || 
|- id="2003 UE428" bgcolor=#d6d6d6
| 0 ||  || MBA-O || 17.1 || 2.1 km || multiple || 2003–2021 || 13 Jun 2021 || 60 || align=left | Alt.: 2011 GE99 || 
|- id="2003 UF428" bgcolor=#E9E9E9
| 0 ||  || MBA-M || 18.0 || data-sort-value="0.75" | 750 m || multiple || 2003–2021 || 19 Mar 2021 || 78 || align=left | Alt.: 2013 EW178 || 
|- id="2003 UG428" bgcolor=#fefefe
| 1 ||  || MBA-I || 18.3 || data-sort-value="0.65" | 650 m || multiple || 1996–2020 || 16 Aug 2020 || 73 || align=left | Alt.: 1996 TA21 || 
|- id="2003 UK428" bgcolor=#fefefe
| 0 ||  || MBA-I || 18.64 || data-sort-value="0.56" | 560 m || multiple || 2003–2021 || 06 Apr 2021 || 93 || align=left | — || 
|- id="2003 UL428" bgcolor=#E9E9E9
| 0 ||  || MBA-M || 17.8 || data-sort-value="0.82" | 820 m || multiple || 2003–2020 || 19 Dec 2020 || 47 || align=left | — || 
|- id="2003 UM428" bgcolor=#fefefe
| 0 ||  || MBA-I || 18.3 || data-sort-value="0.65" | 650 m || multiple || 2003–2020 || 22 Dec 2020 || 39 || align=left | — || 
|- id="2003 UN428" bgcolor=#E9E9E9
| 0 ||  || MBA-M || 17.33 || 1.9 km || multiple || 2003–2021 || 26 Nov 2021 || 120 || align=left | — || 
|- id="2003 UO428" bgcolor=#E9E9E9
| 0 ||  || MBA-M || 18.2 || data-sort-value="0.68" | 680 m || multiple || 2003–2021 || 14 Jan 2021 || 54 || align=left | — || 
|- id="2003 UQ428" bgcolor=#E9E9E9
| 0 ||  || MBA-M || 18.3 || data-sort-value="0.65" | 650 m || multiple || 2001–2019 || 28 Jul 2019 || 42 || align=left | — || 
|- id="2003 UR428" bgcolor=#fefefe
| 0 ||  || MBA-I || 18.5 || data-sort-value="0.59" | 590 m || multiple || 2003–2016 || 25 Oct 2016 || 43 || align=left | Alt.: 2016 QL32 || 
|- id="2003 US428" bgcolor=#FA8072
| 1 ||  || MCA || 18.8 || data-sort-value="0.52" | 520 m || multiple || 2003–2020 || 25 Apr 2020 || 45 || align=left | — || 
|- id="2003 UT428" bgcolor=#fefefe
| 2 ||  || MBA-I || 18.0 || data-sort-value="0.75" | 750 m || multiple || 2003–2016 || 13 Jan 2016 || 35 || align=left | — || 
|- id="2003 UV428" bgcolor=#d6d6d6
| 0 ||  || MBA-O || 17.3 || 1.9 km || multiple || 2003–2019 || 27 Oct 2019 || 40 || align=left | — || 
|- id="2003 UW428" bgcolor=#E9E9E9
| 0 ||  || MBA-M || 17.7 || 1.6 km || multiple || 2003–2020 || 22 Aug 2020 || 53 || align=left | — || 
|- id="2003 UY428" bgcolor=#fefefe
| 0 ||  || MBA-I || 18.8 || data-sort-value="0.52" | 520 m || multiple || 2003–2020 || 06 Dec 2020 || 70 || align=left | — || 
|- id="2003 UZ428" bgcolor=#E9E9E9
| 1 ||  || MBA-M || 18.3 || data-sort-value="0.92" | 920 m || multiple || 2003–2020 || 15 Dec 2020 || 59 || align=left | — || 
|- id="2003 UA429" bgcolor=#fefefe
| 0 ||  || MBA-I || 19.0 || data-sort-value="0.47" | 470 m || multiple || 2003–2019 || 29 Oct 2019 || 39 || align=left | — || 
|- id="2003 UB429" bgcolor=#fefefe
| 0 ||  || MBA-I || 17.8 || data-sort-value="0.82" | 820 m || multiple || 2003–2020 || 16 Aug 2020 || 55 || align=left | — || 
|- id="2003 UC429" bgcolor=#fefefe
| 0 ||  || MBA-I || 18.67 || data-sort-value="0.55" | 550 m || multiple || 2003–2022 || 13 Jan 2022 || 62 || align=left | — || 
|- id="2003 UE429" bgcolor=#d6d6d6
| 0 ||  || MBA-O || 17.7 || 1.6 km || multiple || 2002–2018 || 07 Aug 2018 || 39 || align=left | — || 
|- id="2003 UF429" bgcolor=#d6d6d6
| 0 ||  || MBA-O || 16.8 || 2.4 km || multiple || 2003–2021 || 18 Jan 2021 || 112 || align=left | Alt.: 2016 AM183 || 
|- id="2003 UG429" bgcolor=#d6d6d6
| 0 ||  || MBA-O || 17.1 || 2.1 km || multiple || 2003–2021 || 05 Jun 2021 || 99 || align=left | Alt.: 2010 JA7 || 
|- id="2003 UH429" bgcolor=#d6d6d6
| 0 ||  || MBA-O || 16.61 || 2.7 km || multiple || 2003–2022 || 10 Jan 2022 || 84 || align=left | Alt.: 2010 DM71 || 
|- id="2003 UJ429" bgcolor=#fefefe
| 0 ||  || MBA-I || 18.8 || data-sort-value="0.52" | 520 m || multiple || 2003–2019 || 22 Aug 2019 || 63 || align=left | — || 
|- id="2003 UK429" bgcolor=#d6d6d6
| 0 ||  || MBA-O || 16.63 || 2.6 km || multiple || 2003–2021 || 17 Apr 2021 || 65 || align=left | — || 
|- id="2003 UL429" bgcolor=#d6d6d6
| 0 ||  || MBA-O || 16.0 || 3.5 km || multiple || 2003–2020 || 25 May 2020 || 49 || align=left | — || 
|- id="2003 UN429" bgcolor=#fefefe
| 0 ||  || MBA-I || 18.1 || data-sort-value="0.71" | 710 m || multiple || 2003–2020 || 23 Jan 2020 || 52 || align=left | Alt.: 2003 SG368 || 
|- id="2003 UQ429" bgcolor=#fefefe
| 0 ||  || MBA-I || 18.4 || data-sort-value="0.62" | 620 m || multiple || 2003–2019 || 05 Sep 2019 || 52 || align=left | — || 
|- id="2003 UR429" bgcolor=#E9E9E9
| 0 ||  || MBA-M || 17.51 || 1.8 km || multiple || 2003–2021 || 09 Nov 2021 || 72 || align=left | — || 
|- id="2003 US429" bgcolor=#E9E9E9
| 0 ||  || MBA-M || 18.00 || 1.1 km || multiple || 2003–2021 || 09 Dec 2021 || 72 || align=left | — || 
|- id="2003 UT429" bgcolor=#fefefe
| 2 ||  || MBA-I || 19.3 || data-sort-value="0.41" | 410 m || multiple || 2003–2017 || 24 Nov 2017 || 39 || align=left | — || 
|- id="2003 UV429" bgcolor=#d6d6d6
| 0 ||  || MBA-O || 16.4 || 2.9 km || multiple || 2003–2020 || 24 Jan 2020 || 99 || align=left | — || 
|- id="2003 UY429" bgcolor=#fefefe
| 0 ||  || MBA-I || 18.8 || data-sort-value="0.52" | 520 m || multiple || 2003–2020 || 14 Sep 2020 || 51 || align=left | — || 
|}
back to top

References 
 

Lists of unnumbered minor planets